Development communication refers to the use of communication to facilitate social development. Development communication engages stakeholders and policy makers, establishes conducive environments, assesses risks and opportunities and promotes information exchange to create positive social change via sustainable development. Development communication techniques include information dissemination and education, behavior change, social marketing, social mobilization, media advocacy, communication for social change, and community participation.
Development communication has not been labeled as the "Fifth Theory of the Press", with "social transformation and development", and "the fulfillment of basic needs" as its primary purposes. Jamias articulated the philosophy of development communication which is anchored on three main ideas. Their three main ideas are: purposive, value-laden, and pragmatic. Nora C. Quebral expanded the definition, calling it "the art and science of human communication applied to the speedy transformation of a country and the mass of its people from poverty to a dynamic state of economic growth that makes possible greater social equality and the larger fulfillment of the human potential". Melcote and Steeves saw it as "emancipation communication", aimed at combating injustice and oppression. According to Melcote (1991) in Waisbord (2001), the ultimate goal of development communication is to raise the quality of life of the people, including; to increase income and wellbeing, eradicate social injustice, promote land reforms and freedom of speech

Definition 

Nora Cruz-Quebral, PhD, in the lecture she delivered for an Honorary Doctorate at the London School of Economics, University of London in December 2011, clearly accounted that the Development Communication was first articulated on 10 December 1971 at the University of the Philippines in Los Banos (UPLB). At that time, the UPLB College of Agriculture held a symposium (in honor of Dr. Dioscoro L. Umali, a national scientist in the area of plant breeding) titled "In Search of Breakthroughs in Agricultural Development".

A recent and more encompassing definition of development communication states that it is: Jan Carlo Sabile and the team
...the art and science of human communication linked to a society's planned transformation from a state of poverty to one dynamic socio-economic growth that makes for greater equality and the larger unfolding of individual potentials.

Erskine Childers defined it as:
Development support communications is a discipline in development planning and implementation in which more adequate account is taken of human behavioural factors in the design of development projects and their objectives.

According to the World Bank, the Development Communication is the "integration of strategic communication in development projects" based on a clear understanding of indigenous realities.

In addition, the UNICEF views it as:

"...a two-way process for sharing ideas and knowledge using a range of communication tools and approaches that empower individuals and communities to take actions to improve their lives." The Thusong government center described it as "providing communities with information they can use in improving their lives, which aims at making public programmes and policies real, meaningful and sustainable".

Bessette (2006) defined development communication as a "planned and systematic application of communication resources, channels, approaches and strategies to support the goals of socio-economic, political and cultural development". Development communication is essentially participatory, because, according to Ascroft and Masilela (1994) "participation translates into individuals being active in development programmes and processes; they contribute ideas, take initiative and articulate their needs and their problems, while asserting their autonomy."

Who are development communicators? What qualities do they possess? Nora C. Quebral gave a succinct characterization:

 They understand the process of development, the process of communication, and the environment in which the two processes interact.
 They are knowledgeable in communication skills and techniques as well as proficient in subject matter to be communicated.
 They have internalized the values inherent in equity and the unfolding of individual potential.
 They have firsthand knowledge of the several kinds of end-users of development communication.
 They have a sense of commitment, the acceptance of individual responsibility for advancing human development.

Concepts

According to Felstehausen (1973), conventional theoretical assumptions are drawn from development communications research and are challenged on the grounds that as theoretical concepts they are inadequate guides to the selection of data and the resolution of development problems. The first conceptual fallacy results from the regular practice of choosing operational examples and analogies from the experiences of developed rather than underdeveloped countries. This is especially evident in terms of a bias favoring technology (especially U.S. technology) as a correlate to communication phenomena and as a solution to development problems. The second fallacy results from the use of inappropriate and frequently untested theoretical models within communication research causing a distorted view of the role of communication in relation to social and behavioral systems. The first issue is argued by presenting a review of empirical studies which show that communication processes and the adoption of new technology does not go on apart from the factors which define the behavior of the social, economic and political system. Correlational analyses are of little value in explaining communication processes, or in establishing their role in relation to development. The second issue is addressed by suggesting that communication is to be viewed as part of a social interaction theory in which communication is treated as a process which unveils and transforms reality in the exchange of information among persons. Communication can be defined as a process of accumulating and integrating intelligence. This reformulation shifts the research focus from questions of how communication functions to change persons (senders or receivers), to how it functions to change and transform ideas. Concepts, ideas, interests and positions can then be used as the primary units of analysis.

History 

The practice of development communication began in the 1940s, but widespread application came about after World War II. The advent of communication sciences in the 1950s included recognition of the field as an academic discipline, led by Daniel Lerner, Wilbur Schramm and Everett Rogers. Both Childers and Quebral stressed that DC includes all means of communication, ranging from mass media from people to people.

According to Quebral (1975), the most important feature of Philippines-style development communications is that the government is the "chief designer and administrator of the master (development) plan wherein, development communication, in this system then is purposive, persuasive, goal-directed, audience-oriented, and interventionist by nature".

Academic schools 

Various schools of development communication arose in response to challenges and opportunities in individual countries. Manyozo (2006) broke the field into six schools. The "Bretton Woods" school was originally dominant in international literature. The others were the Latin American, Indian, African, Los Baños and participatory schools.

Catholic social change 

While not per se an academic school, the Church has been conducting "development communication" for many decades. The Catholic Church's social teachings and moral norms parallel those of social development. Rerum novarum (On the New Things), for example, an encyclical written in 1891 by Pope Leo XIII critiqued social ills and promoted "the Catholic doctrine on work, the right to property, the principle of collaboration instead of class struggle as the fundamental means for social change, the rights of the weak, the dignity of the poor and the obligations of the rich, the perfecting of justice through charity, on the right to form professional associations" In 1961, Pope John XXIII, writing on the topic "Christianity and Social Progress", produced an encyclical entitled Mater et magistra (Mother and Teacher), which taught that the "Church is called in truth, justice and love to cooperate in building with all men and women an authentic communion. In this way, economic growth will not be limited to satisfying men's needs, but it will also promote their dignity". Then in 1967, Pope Paul VI published Populorum Progressio(Progressive Development). In it the Pope underscored the importance of justice, peace, and development by declaring that "development is the new name of peace". Addressing development workers, he said, "genuine progress does not consist in wealth sought for personal comfort or for its own sake; rather it consists in an economic order designed for the welfare of the human person, where the daily bread that each man receives reflects the glow of brotherly love and the helping hand of God".

Pope John VI wrote that the Church's very nature was missionary (Lumen gentium – Light of the Nations), and its deepest identity (Evangelii nuntiandi – Sharing the Gospel) embracing the entire life of the Church (Redemptoris missio – Mission of the Redeemer). The content communicated through mission is transformative and liberating—manifested in the message to the poor, setting the captives free, giving sight to the blind, defending the interest of ordinary laborers and the value of work (Laborem exercens – Through Work), promoting the welfare of the widows and the orphans and protecting the rights of children and infants (Pacem in terris – Peace on Earth).

The importance of engagement for social transformation and development is also asserted in the Catechism of the Catholic Church, which states that, "as far as possible citizens should take an active part in public life; the manner of this participation may vary from one country or culture to another... as with any ethical obligation, the participation of all in realizing the common good calls for a continually renewed conversion of the social partners" (pp. 1915–1916). Moreover, Gaudium et spes (Joy and Hope), commonly referred to as the Magna Carta of the Catholic Church's teaching on human dignity, states, "to satisfy the demands of justice and equity, strenuous efforts must be made, without disregarding the rights of persons or the natural qualities of each country, to remove as quickly as possible the immense economic inequalities which now exist and in many cases are growing and which are connected with individual and social discrimination".

The involvement of many organizations and individual members of the Catholic Church in highlighting the plight of the needy and reaching out to the disadvantaged through works in education, health, livelihood projects, among others, serves as a concrete example of a Church that communicates a transformative and life-changing message.

The Church advocates "establishing new relationships in human society, under the mastery and guidance of truth, justice, charity and freedom—relations between individual citizens, between citizens and their respective States, between States, and finally between individuals, families, intermediate associations and States on the one hand, and the world community on the other". Pope John Paul II, touching in part on Quebral's (2007) thought on 'development communication in a borderless world', instructed Christian communicators to "interpret modern cultural needs, committing themselves to approaching the communications age not as a time of alienation and confusion, but as a valuable time for the quest for the truth and for developing communion between persons and peoples".

Bretton Woods 

The Bretton Woods school of development communication paralleled the economic strategies outlined in the Marshall Plan, the Bretton Woods system and of the World Bank and the International Monetary Fund in 1944.
The little-used name served to differentiate the original paradigm from other schools that evolved later. Leading theorists included Daniel Lerner, Wilbur Schramm and Everett Rogers. Due to his pioneering influence, Rogers was referred to as "one of the founding fathers of development communication."

This approach to development communication was criticized by Latin American researchers such as Luis Ramiro Beltan and Alfonso Gumucio Dagron, because it emphasized problems in the developing nation rather than its unequal relation with developed countries. They claimed that it proposed industrial capitalism as a universal solution and that many projects failed to address obstacles such as lack of access to land, agricultural credits, and fair market prices.

Failed projects in the 1960s led to revisions. Manyozo found that the school had been the most dynamic in testing and adopting new approaches and methodologies.

Institutions associated with the Bretton Woods school of development communication include:
United Nations Educational, Scientific and Cultural Organization (UNESCO)
Food and Agriculture Organization of the United Nations (FAO)
Rockefeller Foundation
Department for International Development, United Kingdom
Ford Foundation

Latin America 

The Latin American school of development communication predates the Bretton Woods school, emerging in the 1940s with the efforts of Colombia's Radio Sutatenza and Bolivia's Radios Mineras. They pioneered participatory and educational approaches to empowering the marginalised. In effect, they served as the earliest models for participatory broadcasting efforts around the world.

In the 1960s Paolo Freire's theories of critical pedagogy and Miguel Sabido's enter-educate method became important elements of the Latin American development communication school.

Other influential theorists include Juan Diaz Bordenave, Luis Ramiro Beltran, and Alfonso Gumucio Dagron (Manyozo 2006, Manyozo, 2005).

In the 1990s, technological advances facilitated social change and development: new media outlets emerged, cable TV reached more regions, and the growth of local communication firms paralleled the growth of major media corporations.

India 

Organized development communication in India began with rural radio broadcasts in the 1940s. Broadcasts adopted indigenous languages to reach larger audiences.

Organized efforts in India started with community development projects in the 1950s. The government, guided by socialist ideals and politicians, started many development programs. Field publicity was employed for person-to-person communication. The radio played an important role in reaching the masses because literacy was low. Educational institutions – especially agricultural universities, through their extension networks – and international organizations under the United Nations umbrella experimented with development communication.

Non-governmental organizations (NGOs) relied on close inter-personal relations among communicators.

Communication from the government was more generic and unidirectional. So-called Public Information Campaigns were government-sponsored public fairs in remote areas that presented entertainment along with information on social and developmental schemes. Villagers engaged in competitions to attract attendees. Public and private organizations sponsored stalls in the main exhibition area. Development agencies and service/goods providers also attended. Some state governments employed this model.

Community radio was used in rural India. NGOs and educational institutions created local stations to broadcast information, advisories and messages on development. Local participation was encouraged. Community radio provided a platform for villagers to publicize local issues, offering the potential to elicit action from local officials.

The widespread adoption of mobile telephony in India created new channels for reaching the masses.

Africa 

The African school of development communication sprang from the continent's post-colonial and communist movements in the late 1960s and early 1970s. Anglophone Africa employed radio and theatre for community education, adult literacy, health and agricultural education (Kamlongera, 1983, Mlama, 1971).

In 1994, the FAO project "Communication for Development in Southern Africa" was a pioneer in supporting and enhancing development projects and programs through the use of participatory communication. The FAO project, placed under SADC, developed an innovative methodology known as Participatory Rural Communication Appraisal (PRCA), which combined participatory tools and techniques with a strong communication focus needed to enhance projects results and sustainability. FAO and SADC published a handbook on PRCA that was used in projects around the world.

The radio maintained a strong presence in research and practice into the 21st century. Radio was especially important in rural areas, as the work of the non-governmental organization Farm Radio International and its members across sub-Saharan Africa demonstrated. Knowledge exchange between development partners such as agricultural scientists and farmers were mediated through rural radio (Hambly Odame, 2003).

Philippines 

Systematic study and practice began at the University of the Philippines Los Baños in the 1970s, through the establishment of the Department of Development Communication in the College of Agriculture, which offered undergraduate and master's degrees.

Quebral coined the term "development communication" while at the university's Office of Extension and Publications, now the College of Development Communication (CDC). According to Felix Librero, the term was first used by Quebral in her 1971 paper, "Development Communication in the Agricultural Context," presented in at a symposium at the University of the Philippines Los Baños. In her paper, Quebral argued that development communication had become a science, requiring the tasks associated with communicating development-oriented issues be based on scientific inquiry. At the time the field was limited to agricultural and rural development.

At the time the term 'development support communication' was used in UNDP programmes under Erskine Childers, with coauthor and wife, Malicca Vajrathron. This area of research focused on the functions of communication in promoting UN agricultural and development programmes. Development communication at Los Baños became an academic field rather than a techniques program. Quebral cited Seers's definition of development in arguing for the term, as opposed to Childer's 'development support communication', which was used in public and in the scientific literature for the first time. Librero recounted that colleagues in agricultural communications in Los Baños agreed with Quebral, but colleagues from the field of mass communication in the University of the Philippines Diliman, and from countries in North America, did not initially agree, although they ultimately relented.

In 1993, in the Institute of Development Communication's faculty papers series, Alexander Flor proposed expanding the definition of development communication to include the perspective of cybernetics and general systems theory:

If information counters entropy and societal breakdown is a type of entropy, then there must be a specific type of information that counters societal entropy. The exchange of such information – be it at the individual, group, or societal level – is called development communication.

Thailand 

In Thailand, development communication is presently overseen by Kasetsart University through its International Center for Development Communication (ICDC).  The center's vision is to be a leading centre of excellence in development training, communication and consultancy services.  As an extension arm of Kasetsart University its international service mission includes building and maintaining quality services to support organizations in their efforts for sustainable development in social and economic sectors.

Participatory development communication 

The evolution of the participatory development communication school involved collaboration between First World and Third World development communication organizations. It focused on community involvement in development efforts and was influenced by Freirean critical pedagogy and the Los Baños school (Besette, 2004).

World Bank 

The World Bank actively promotes this field through its Development Communication division and published the Development Communication Sourcebook in 2008, a resource addressing the history, concepts and practical applications of this discipline.

Development Communication or Communication for Development

World Bank tends to espouse and promote the title "Development Communication" while UNICEF uses "Communication for Development". The difference seems to be a matter of semantics and not ideology since the end goals of these global organizations are almost identical to each other.

UNICEF explains: 

World Bank defines Development Communication "as an interdisciplinary field, is based on empirical research that helps to build consensus while it facilitates the sharing of knowledge to achieve a positive change in the development initiative. It is not only about effective dissemination of information but also about using empirical research and two-way communications among stakeholders". (Development Communication division, the World Bank).

Examples 
One of the first examples of development communication was Farm Radio Forums in Canada. From 1941 to 1965 farmers met weekly to listen to radio programs, supplemented by printed materials and prepared questions to encourage discussion. At first, this was a response to the Great Depression and the need for increased food production in World War II. Later the Forums dealt with social and economic issues. This model of adult education or distance education was later adopted in India and Ghana.
Radio DZLB was the community broadcasting station of UPLB College of Development Communication. It was a forerunner of the school-on-air (SOA) concept that provided informal education for farmers. DZLB hosted SOAs on nutrition, pest management and cooperatives. DZLB aired educational programming for farmers and cooperatives.
Established in 2009, Global South Development Magazine has been a recent example of development communication in practice.
Instructional television was used in El Salvador during the 1970s to improve primary education. One problem was a lack of trained teachers. Teaching materials were improved to make them more relevant. More children attended school and graduation rates increased.
In the 1970s in Korea the Planned Parenthood Federation succeed in lowering birth rates and improving life in villages such as Oryu Li. It mainly used interpersonal communication in women's clubs. Oryu Li's success did not recur in all villages. The initial effort had the advantage of a remarkable local leader and visits from the provincial governor.
A social marketing project in Bolivia in the 1980s tried to get women in the Cochabamba Valley to use soybeans in their cooking. This was an attempt to deal with chronic malnourishment among children. The project used cooking demonstrations, posters and broadcasts on local commercial radio stations. Some people tried soybeans but the outcome of the project was unclear.
In 1999 the US and DC Comics planned to distribute 600,000 comic books to children affected by the Kosovo War. The books were in Albanian and featured Superman and Wonder Woman. The aim was to teach children what to do when they find an unexploded land mine left over from Kosovo's civil war. The comic books instruct children not to touch and not to move, but instead to call an adult for help.
Since 2002, Journalists for Human Rights, a Canadian NGO, has operated projects in Ghana, Sierra Leone, Liberia, and the Democratic Republic of the Congo. JHR works directly with journalists, providing monthly workshops, student sessions, on the job training and additional programs on a country by country basis.
Cuban Media and Education – In 1961, the year of education, the well known literacy campaign was initiated. Television and radio played a complementary role in the dissemination of literacy training programs. Live coverage of literacy worker and students was used to dramatise and this was reinforced on radio and in newspapers.

Policy 

Development communication policy covers formal and informal processes where interests are defined, expressed and negotiated by actors with different levels of power and with the goal of influencing policy decisions.

Alexander G. Flor, PhD, a noted development communicator and professor at the University of the Philippines Los Banos (UPLB) and University of the Philippines Open University (UPOU), posits that development communication and the policy sciences are linked inextricably albeit distinct and mutually exclusive disciplines. "Policy sciences", he states in a nutshell, is the scientific study of policies and policy-making while "policy" is the set of decisions with specific objectives and target audience.

Development communication is intended to build consensus and facilitate knowledge sharing to achieve positive change in development initiatives. It disseminates information and employs empirical research, two-way communication and dialogue among stakeholders. It is a management tool to help assess socio-political risks and opportunities. By using communication to bridge differences and take action towards change, development communication can lead to successful and sustainable results.

Development communication is a response to historic, social and economic factors that limit access to information and citizen participation. These include poverty and unemployment, limited access to basic services, remote settlement patterns, lack of access to technology, lack of information, inadequate health services, lack of education and skills and lack of infrastructure.

FAO asserted that communication can play a decisive role in promoting human development. Democracy, decentralization and the market economy empower individuals and communities to control their own destinies. Stimulating awareness, participation, and capabilities are vital. Policies must encourage effective planning and implementation of communication programs.

Lee advocated that communication policies and practices require joint action among leaders in social, economic, scientific, educational and foreign affairs and that success requires constant contact and consultation with communicators and citizens.

UNESCO conducted studies on communication policies as part of the resolutions adopted by the General Conference of UNESCO during its 16th session in 1970. Its objective was to promote awareness of communication policies at the governmental, institutional and professional levels of selected member states. The selected countries were Ireland, Sweden, Hungary, Yugoslavia, West Germany, and Brazil. Two years later, a UNESCO meeting of experts on communication policies and planning defined communication policy as a set of norms established to guide the behavior of communication media. According to these experts, the scope of communication policies comprises:
The values that determine the structure of communication systems and guide their operation
The systems of communication, their structures, and operation
The output of these systems and their impact and social functions

The Asian Media Information and Communication Centre (AMIC) was commissioned by UNESCO to do a feasibility study on "Training in Communication Planning in Asia" in 1974.
It organized the first AMIC Regional Conference on Development Communication Policies and Planning in Manila, Philippines in May 1977. Attended by delegates from ten countries, it drew up basic recommendations including the organization of national development communication councils by each country's governmental, educational and media groups.

According to Habermann and De Fontgalland, the difficulties in the adoption of a viable development communication policy have to be simultaneously analyzed horizontally and vertically. Horizontally government agencies, semi-governmental offices (e.g., rural extension service), independent development organizations and private media outlets must coordinate policy. Vertically, information must flow in both directions between the population base and decision-making bodies. This involves local and supra-local administrations that are active in handing out directives and reporting back to the government. Commonly, default policies do not encourage/require such institutions to feed information from the populace to policymakers, with the exception of government extension bureaus.

In 1986 Quebral stressed the importance of equally recognizing systematic practice along with formal research as a legitimate basis for decisions. According to her, research must precede and become the foundation of policy.

Stakeholder analysis 

The design and implementation of policies is becoming more complex, and the number and type of actors involved in policy implementation more diverse; hence, the policy process is evolving towards multi-actor and multi-goal situations. "Stakeholder" has been variously defined according to the goal of the analysis, the analytic approach or the policy area. Where several groups of stakeholders are involved in the policy process, a stakeholder analysis can provide a useful resource.

Stakeholder analysis can help analyze the behavior, intentions, interrelations, agendas, interests and the resources of stakeholders in the policy processes. Crosby described stakeholder analysis as offering methods and approaches to analyze the interests and roles of key players. Hannan and Freeman include groups or individual who can affect or be affected by the achievement of the organization's objectives, while others exclude those who cannot influence the outcome. For instance, Brugha and Varvasovszky defined stakeholder as "individuals, groups, and organizations who have an interest (stake) and the potential to influence the actions and aims of an organization, project, or policy direction." According to Flor, a stakeholder analysis of communication policy would reveal the interplay of the following sectors:
Government – Enacts all communication policies, making it the most powerful stakeholder.
Education sector – Conducts research that underlies subsequent policies.
Communication industry – Influences communication policies. May adopt self-regulation to avoid/delay government regulation. For example, the Kapisanan ng mga Brodkaster sa Pilipinas and the Philippine Press Institute institute ethics codes.
Private sector – Avoid policies that limit content and to protect themselves from opponents.
Religious sector – Traditionally opposes policies that allow obscenity, violence and profanity to be distributed.
Foreign interests – e.g., international lending agencies may demand the end of monopolies—including state media entities—as a condition for financial aid.
Consumers – Traditionally not consulted, but more recently claiming to protect the public interest.

The United Nations has recognised the importance of "the need to support two-way communication systems that enable dialogue and that allow communities to express their aspirations and concerns and participate in decisions...." Such two-way interactions can help expose local reality.
Keune and Sinha claim that community involvement in development communication policy is important, as they are the "ultimate and perhaps the most important beneficiaries of development communication policies and planning".

Historical perspectives 

Cuilenburg and McQuail (2003) identify three main phases of communications policy-making:
 Emerging Communications Industry Policy (until the Second World War)—during this era, communications policy mainly supported state and corporate benefits. Policy-covered telegraph, telephony and wireless and later, cinema. Policies were ad hoc measures designed to facilitate a series of technical innovations.
Public Service Media Policy (1945–1980)—After the Second World War, policy was dominated by sociopolitical rather than economic and national strategic concerns. This phase began after the Second World War. Policy expanded from addressing technical matters to the content of communications and to cover the traditional press.
New Communications Policy Paradigm (1980 to present)—Technological, economic and social trends fundamentally changed media policy from 1980 onward. Technological convergence became an agenda item when the US Office of Technology Assessment published its pioneering study, Critical Connections (OTA, 1990) followed by the European Union (CEC, 1997). "Convergence" meant that the boundaries between information technologies blurred: computer and telecommunications converged to telematics; personal computers and television become more similar; and formerly separated networks become interconnected. Regulation of mass media became increasingly linked to telecommunications regulation. Globalization and the permeability of national frontiers by multinational media limited the impact of policy in most countries.

Critiques 

Development communication policy as a field experienced persistent conflict. Debates operated within the discourse of each period: autonomous vs. dependent in the 1950s; unequal North–South communication flows in the 60s and 70s; transnational corporations and non-governmental actors in the 80s; the converged global information society and the market-based media structure in the 90s; and online media and the digital divide in the 2000s.

Participation 
Hamelink and Nordenstreng called for multistakeholder participation in information and communications technology (ICT) governance and for formal and informal policy development mechanisms to enable state and non-state actors to shape the media and communication industries.

Funding agency bias 

Manyozo advocated a rethinking of communication for development policies, perceiving a failure by communication policy makers to identify funding institutions that encourage cultural imperialism and unequal power relations between Western and local organizations. He attributed this to the absence in communication policy debates of a political economy discourse. In reviewing the different approaches to communication for development policies—media, participation and community dialogue—Manyozo criticizes groups that emphasizes one over the others.

Development communication policy science 

Development communication and the policy sciences provide a distinct role of development communication that is apart from traditional mass communication, its purposive nature (Flor, 1991). With this, communication strategies deemed at sustainable development are hereby presented (Servaes & Malikhao (2007):
a) Behavior Change Communication (BCC, interpersonal communication)
b) Mass Communication (MC, mix of community media, mass media and ICTs)
c) Advocacy Communication (AC, mix of interpersonal and/or mass communication)
d) Participatory Communication (PC, interpersonal communication and community media)

Flor (1991) argues the importance of application of knowledge in social sciences where most of policy principles are drawn from. In the conduct of developmental activities, the role of communication is critical as it influences participation of individuals given that relevant information is well-disseminated. For instance, communication media are critical in creating awareness, generating public interest and demand, and placing the issue on the public agenda and building social support (Servaes, 2008).

Development communication policy science take off from development theory that which it says that policy recommendation becomes an engine to the process of social change (Servaes, 1986).  The concept of development communication policy science has reference to the following:
a) Diffusion model which enunciates that 'that the role of communication was (1) to transfer technological innovations from development agencies to their clients, and (2) to create an appetite for change through raising a 'climate for modernization' among the members of the public'.
b) The participatory model which incorporates the concept of multiplicity development through democratization and participation at all levels – international, national, local and individual but values the cultural identity of local communities.

A typology of Participation in Development Initiatives illustrates a participation ladder (Mefalopulos, 2018) starting from the lowest form which is merely a form of token participation, to the highest form, where local stakeholders share equal weight in decision making with external stakeholders. The participation ladder consists of the following: (a) Passive participation. Stakeholders participate by being informed about what is going to happen or has already happened. People's feedback is minimal or nonexistent, and individual participation is assessed mainly through head-counting and occasionally through their participation in the discussion. (b) Participation by consultation Stakeholders participate by providing feedback to questions posed by outside researchers or experts. Because their input is not limited to meetings, it can be provided at different points in time. In the final analysis, however, this consultative process keeps all the decision-making power in the hands of external professionals who are under no obligation to incorporate stakeholders' input. (c) Functional participation. Stakeholders take part in discussions and analysis of pre-determined objectives set by the project. This kind of participation, while it does not usually result in dramatic changes on "what" objectives are to be achieved, does provide valuable inputs on "how" to achieve them. Functional participation implies the use of horizontal communication among stakeholders. (d) Empowered participation. Stakeholders are willing and able to be part of the process and participate in joint analysis, which leads to joint decision making about what should be achieved and how. While the role of outsiders is that of equal partners in the initiative, local stakeholders are equal partners with a decisive say in decisions concerning their lives.
Flor recognizes the affinity of Development Communication and Policy Science; hence coined "Development Communication Policy Science". In his writings, this concept can be deduced to mean creating guidelines that "stems from the need for actively applying knowledge from and principles of the social sciences in solving large-scale societal problems under conditions of social change" and of which in the process communication is a critical variable.

UNESCO posits that in order to effect positive developmental change, there is a need to form people and processes that facilitate the creation of knowledge.  For development to happen, a two-way horizontal model which allow direct participation of those most affected by the development issue(s) can be adopted. In this model, the stakeholder's participation are in a form of defining and implementing solutions and identifying development directions. Engaging in dialogue with stakeholders for purposes of understanding their perceptions, perspectives, values, attitudes and practices are essential inputs to the design and implementation of development initiatives.

Development communication policy science is a thriving and a contemporary field in social sciences. It is the application of the policy sciences to improve policy development, implementation and evaluation in the development communication context. According to Flor (1991), development communication and policy sciences are regarded as distinct and mutually exclusive areas of study but are inextricably linked. He added that development communication and the policy sciences, although different in scope, stem from the same rationale: the need for actively applying knowledge from the principles of social sciences in solving large-scale societal problems under conditions of social change. Separately, development communication is a purposive, pragmatic, and value-laden development intervention while the policy sciences are the scientific study of policies and policy-making for the social good. Both endorse a normative or prescriptive role for the social sciences, work to alleviate societal problems and recognize communication's important function (Ongkiko & Flor, 2006). As an academic discipline, development communication policy science is the study of the use of the art and the science of policy in the development communication context.
Development communication's ultimate goal is to catalyze local development activities, local development planning and implementation, and local communication to smoothen the path to development. It is the science which uses communication to educate, change and motivate people's attitudes and values leading to developmental goals Policy is a term which frames the action rather than simply describing it (Colebatch, 2002). Thus, it labels what we see so that we can make sense of it in a particular way. Understanding policy means understanding the way in which practitioners use it to shape action. It leads us to ask who is involved in what setting, how the action is framed and what significance in this process of the idea of authorized purpose, and not simply an outcome. Indeed, the "approach of the policy science is forward-looking and anticipatory".

Thus, development communication comprises the utilization of strategic communication to address the pressing issues and problems in the society. It is an area of study where the roles of media to aid in the social transformation is considered an utmost importance. According to Melkotea and Steeves (2015), while communication has been referred to as shared meaning, development is considered as empowerment in the development communication, where it seeks to understand the social issues at all levels.

The two fields are undoubtedly different. However, Flor accurately stated that "both stem from the same rationale: the need for actively applying knowledge and principles of the social sciences in solving large-scale societal problems under conditions of social change". The connection between the two fields will be apparent once the question, 'what is the policy for?' is answered. Since policy is the pursuit of goals and the effect they have on the action; and development communication aims to facilitate social change, the two processes are represented as a sequence of stages in the development, beginning with the thought and the intention (policy), moving through action brought about by communication, and ending with the solution (action). To reiterate, unless the policy decision could shape the action, there would be no point in making it.

When policy sciences and development communication have been firmly established in an organization or community, the instruments of policy analysis will provide "unprecedented versatility and effectiveness" (Lasswell, 1969). Specifically, the practice and application of social marketing strategies to influence the stakeholders in making decisions to create not only an individual but also social change.

It is important to know and understand that the stakeholders are not only the decision makers alone. Flor (1991) identified seven sectors as stakeholders: the government, the education sector, the communication, industry, the private sector, the church, foreign vested interests and the consumers.  Flor discussed the different concerns of each sectors such as the education sector for its involvement in communication aspect; the church, in fulfillment of its outreach activities; and the private sectors concerning how policies would affect how they do business. But among the enumerated sectors, the government still serves as the most powerful sector as it has a direct hand in implementing policies. While the government is the most powerful, the most important stakeholder, but apparently the least involved in development of a policy, is actually the consumer or the regular citizens. While the government may impose a policy or a regulation, the success of it falls on the adoption and cooperation of the consumers.

Development communication is a contemporary field in social science. It uses scientific methods to enrich its own field through research where theories and principles can be derived and applied to development problems. It is defined as the interaction of two social processes- development and communication-in any given environment, and in 1971, the definition changed to the art and science of human communication applied to the speedy transformation of a country and the mass of its people from poverty to a dynamic state of economic growth that makes possible greater social equality and the larger fulfillment of the human potential. Its domain is best described by the phrase 'communication and development'. This suggests that both mediated and non-mediated forms of communication are relevant to the development issue. This compromise is especially useful with the growing importance for development of the new information and communication technologies. The main scope and functions of development communication are not exclusively about communicating information and messages, but it also involves engaging stakeholders and assessing the situation. Communication is not only about "selling ideas." Such a conception could have been appropriate in the past, currently, the scope of development communication has broadened to include an analytical aspect as well as a dialogical one—intended to open public spaces where perceptions, opinions, and knowledge of relevant stakeholders can be aired and assessed. It is applied to engage stakeholders, assess the situation, and devise effective strategies leading to better and more sustainable development initiatives. It is more than transmitting information. It is about using communication to generate new knowledge and consensus in order to facilitate change. Between the two social processes, Communication is the vehicle that carries development onward. Quebral (2012) mentioned in the definition of Development Communication the art and science of human communication. The science of communication is a research-driven consultative process involving planning, design and implementation of strategic interventions. It provides relevant information and adequate motivation to impact on attitudes and behaviors of individuals or groups of people. The artistic side of communication involves designing creative messages and products, and identifying effective interpersonal, group and mass-media channels based on the sound knowledge of the participants we seek to reach. Communication for Development is a social process based on dialogue using a broad range of tools and methods. It is also about seeking change at different levels, including listening, building trust, sharing knowledge and skills, building policies, debating and learning for sustained and meaningful change.

Development Communication and Policy Sciences are inextricably linked. Policy Sciences grew out of a multidisciplinary effort within the social sciences, based initially at the University of Chicago and later at the Social Science Research Council (SSRC), to develop theories and methods of integrating insights from multiple disciplines in the interest of providing a distinct integrative framework for understanding and addressing complex social problems. The University of Chicago and SSRC developments were themselves an outgrowth of earlier efforts that dated to at least the middle of the 19th century.). It is a new set of paradigm which is oriented towards the needs of applying structured rationality, systematic knowledge and organized creativity to the directed development of humanity. The main concern of Policy Sciences is with understanding and improvement of macro control systems, which is, policy making systems. Policy making is not about its substantive content but rather with the improved methods, knowledge, and systems for better policy making. In 1971, Lasswell's identified two separate approaches to the policy sciences: one emphasizing in knowledge of the policy process and another emphasizing knowledge for use in the policy process.  Lasswell's chosen phrase was "the policy sciences of democracy". To stress "sciences" resulted in a vision of rational analysis, while to stress 'democracy; led to a vision of politicizes governmental processes. The distinction is important in drawing attention to policy analysis as an academic activity concerned primarily with advancing understanding; and policy analysis as applied activity concerned mainly with contributing to the solution of social problems. This vision of scientific method and democratic humanism, however, proved operationally difficult as the policy sciences moved to realize status and recognition during the 1960 and 1970's. These two approaches- process and content strengthened their respective identities, each claiming some sort of conceptual superiority. Operationally the two approaches are: POLICY ANALYSIS is concerned with knowledge in and for policy process, while, POLICY PROCESS is concerned with knowledge about the formation and implementation of public policy. Policy analysis and Policy process focus on real-world problems and require application of both normative and behavioral sciences. The underlying disciplines of policy sciences are the management sciences (operations research, cost-effective analysis, systems analysis, economics and more) and the behavioral sciences (political science, sociology, social psychology, organization theory, behavioral theory of the firm, psychology of judgment and more). The management sciences can be viewed as sciences of normative knowledge- what one should do with the application of their methodologies involving optimization of some objective function.

Policy Sciences has long been at the forefront of development issues. while, Development Communication's chief purpose is about social transformation and development, the fulfillment of basic needs. Both fields, development communication and policy sciences are concerned with scientific methods, and choosing and evaluating the relevance of available knowledge for the solution of particular problems that will enrich humanity. In essence, development communication is the sharing of knowledge aimed at reaching a consensus for action that takes into account the interests, needs and capacities of all concerned. It is thus a social process. While, Policy Sciences hold forth the hope of improving the most backward of all human institutions and habits, which is policy making and decision making. It constitutes a major attempt to assert and achieve a central role for rationality and intellectualism in human affairs and to increase by jumps the capacity of humanity to direct its future.

Policy sciences 
Policy sciences provide an integrated approach in solving various problems in local, national, regional and international level. Coined by Harold D. Lasswell, policy sciences draw knowledge from various disciplines where recommendations are formulated, hence, its integrated approach. Because of its integrative nature, policy sciences follow a systems approach such that elements are interrelated and forms a 'generality principle'.

Following its interdisciplinary nature is the idea that policy sciences encourage diversity of perspectives from various disciplines. This instigates consultative communication from various individuals in the principle of common interest.

In the pursuit of knowledge, policy scientists need to be careful in deciphering relevance of particular knowledge given the impact of various knowledge sources that are trying to influence policy decisions. In this regard, informed decisions are drawn from critiquing, careful analysis and recommendations that will be beneficial to many rather than a few individuals. 

Lasswell (1970: 3) defines policy sciences as knowledge of the policy process as well as knowledge in this process. Torgerson (1985) states that Lasswell proposed the development of policy science-or policy sciences-as an interdisciplinary field to embrace all the social sciences and to produce knowledge applicable to public problems. The term "policy sciences" in its plural form, therefore, emphasizes its interdisciplinary nature (Flor, 1991). According to Hale (2011), the central aim of policy sciences is to resolve problems [in the service of human dignity] and the diverse human, historical, and contextual element in public policy-making. This is a reiteration of the Lasswellian maxim on public policy in the following key elements: "contextual"; "problem-oriented"; "multi-method inquiry" or diverse empirical methods, "political", "normative, welfare-oriented" in the case of social policy goals; and posing "interdisciplinarity" or moving between humanities and social sciences. Indeed, Lasswell's original goal of the policy sciences was to provide, "intelligence pertinent to the integration of values realized by and embodied by interpersonal relations [such as] human dignity and the realization of human capacities" (Lasswell and Kaplan, 1950: p. xii). The "policy sciences" therefore adopts an approach to understanding and solving problems that draw on and contribute to all fields of knowledge (Quebral, 2006) and sets out procedures in an integrated and comprehensive form to help clarify and secure common interests.

According to Harold Lasswell (1971), the policy sciences are concerned with the knowledge of and in the decision processes of the public and civic order. Knowledge of decision processes points to the empirical and scientific understanding of how policies are made and executed. At one moment, the analyst regards his subject-matter as an objective phenomenon, but this phase alternates with another in which the analyst comes to view himself as actively involved in the phenomenon which he investigates. Inquiry displays both tension and interplay between these moments; they are distinct yet interwoven, complementary in the ongoing development and refinement of contextual orientation (Togerson, 1985). Empirical knowledge pertains to those generated through scientific inquiry and observation as applied to decision processes. As such, the notion of the policy sciences is construed in various shades since it was introduced in the 1940s and over the years, Lasswell and his colleagues refined the concept, through practice and peer review, as the intellectual tools needed to support problem-oriented, contextual, and multi-method inquiry in the service of human dignity for all. The policy sciences is a forward-looking body of knowledge, with the plural form emphasizing its interdisciplinary and holistic nature. It recognizes the multiplicity of factors affecting certain problems and multi-dimensions of certain phenomena that are subject to decision processes. According to Laswell (1971, p. 39), an adequate strategy of problem solving in policy sciences encompasses five intellectual tasks performed at varying levels of insight and understanding namely: goal clarification; trend description; analysis of conditions; projection of developments; and invention, evaluation, and selection of alternatives. As such, the emphasis of policy sciences is on applying scientific or empirical evidences in understanding problems so that more realistic, responsive and effective interventions are identified and implemented.  Since a problem is multidimensional, various scientific disciplines are needed to form a comprehensive analysis of a certain phenomenon. The trend toward a policy sciences viewpoint is a move away from fragmentation and the fragmented "worm's eye view" of policy matters.

According to Yehezkel Dror in his article entitled, "Approaches to Policy Sciences," two of the main features of policy sciences can be summarized as follows:
1) Policy sciences, as with all applied scientific knowledge, are, in principle, instrumental-normative in the sense of being concerned with means and intermediate goals rather than absolute values. But policy sciences are sensitive to the difficulties of achieving "value free sciences" and try to contribute to value choice by exploring value implications, value consistencies, value costs, and the behavioral foundations of value commitments.
2) Policy sciences emphasize meta-policies (that is, policies on policies), including modes of policy-making, policy analysis, policy-making systems, and policy strategies. While the main test of policy sciences is better achievement of considered goals through more effective and efficient policies, policy sciences as such do not deal with discrete policy problems, but do provide improved methods and knowledge for doing so. Furthermore, he mentioned that the main foci of concern for policy sciences include, for example, (i) policy analysis, which provides heuristic methods for identification of preferable policy alternatives; (ii) policy strategies, which provide guidelines for postures, assumptions, and main guidelines to be followed by specific policies (for example, with respect to incrementalism versus innovation, attitudes to risk and time, comprehensive versus shock policies, and goal-oriented versus capacity oriented policies); (iii) evaluation and feedback, including, for instance, social indicators, social experimentation, and organizational learning; and (iv) improvement of the system for policymaking-by redesign and sometimes nova design (designing anew), including changes in input, personnel, structure, equipment, external demands, and so forth.

As defined by Laswell (1970), the policy sciences may be conceived as knowledge of the policy process and of the relevance of knowledge in the process. Its approach is anticipatory which aims to improve policymaking in order to provide as much lead time as necessary in the solution of societal problems. However, it should be considered that since it is a science, the knowledge that can be acquired in the process should be based on the concept of scientific evidence. Therefore, one issue that may arise along the way is how to regard societal problems and issues scientifically. However, according to Lasswell and McDougal (1992), while the problems are addressed scientifically, there is also a need for considering the contextual and normative approach to solving problems. The reason is that the knowledge produced is not only universalizable but ethical and empirico-analytical. Through this, policy science is thought not only problem-oriented but also multidisciplinary and contextual.

Generally, the relationship between development communication and the policy sciences can be described as inextricable although both fields of study have different concentration, scope, and limitations. Furthermore, both development communication and the policy sciences share the same practice: the need for actively applying knowledge from and principles of the social sciences in solving large-scale societal problems under conditions of social change. In today's society where it is being described as troubled and problematic, there is no better way to confront the societal issues but to have a strong knowledge and a better understanding of communication policy.

The policy sciences provide an integrated and comprehensive approach for addressing issues and problems at all levels in ways that help clarify and secure the common interest. Policy sciences are concerned with helping people make better decisions toward fostering human dignity for all. Since we are living in a "turbulent field" environment, policy science is necessary to address issues before it will get bigger. The approach of policy sciences, as cited by Flor in his article, is forward-looking or anticipatory. Policy sciences tell us what we need to do and prepare before certain issues or problems occur. Using an allegorical definition, Dror (1971), as cited by Ongkiko and Flor (2006), explains that "one should not leave the problem of crossing a river until the river is reached; rather, one should survey the territory in advance, identify rivers flowing through it, decide whether it is at all necessary to cross the river—and if so, where and how to cross it—then prepare in advance the materials for crossing the river and design a logistics network so that the material is ready when the river is reached." Furthermore, given its interdisciplinary and holistic nature, policy sciences does consider several variables (education, communication, money, culture) in coming up with a decision. These variables are important factors in coming up with a sound and relevant policy.

In the context of communication policy development, the policy sciences are necessary to make more purposeful, responsive, and effective communication policies. Profoundly influenced by Freud and Marx, Lasswell emphasized the importance of the contextual orientation of policy analysts, both individually and collectively (Lasswell, 1965). When he first articulated this principle of contextuality, Lasswell indeed referred explicitly to the "exposition of the dialectical method" (1965) in Lukacs's History and Class Consciousness, adding that the insights of psychoanalysis provided a complement to the Marxian dialectic which would aid in understanding "the symbolic aspects of historical development" (Laswell, 1965, p. 19). Here Lasswell proposed a mode of contextual-configurative analysis whereby, through "an act of creative orientation" (Laasswell, 1965, p. 13), the inquirer could locate himself in an 'all-encompassing totality" (Lasswell, 1965, p. 12). In this regard, Lasswell considered such contextual orientation indispensable to the conduct of rational inquiry, and urged the use of contextual-configurative analysis in the development of a policy science profession. Hale (2011, p. 221) contends that Lasswell saw that robust policy solutions could only be obtained by insisting upon a commitment to contextuality, problem orientation, and methodological diversity. All for good reasons: first, no decision can adequately be understood apart from the larger social process in which it is itself apart. Thus contextuality is a key element in the policy sciences. As a reliance on ideology, principle, and grand historical projects cannot, given the complexity and contextuality of policy problems, serve with reliable solution, a discipline geared to resolve problems should expressly orient itself on those problems and should be purposeful. Thus problem orientation is the second key element in the policy sciences. Finally, due to the multidimensionality and complexity of many of these problems it stands to reason that the policy scientist should draw from a diversity of methodologies. Thus methodological diversity is the third key element in the policy sciences. It is Lasswell's sincere belief that understanding the policy formation and decision-making process will eventually also be beneficial in the creation of public policy (Hale, 2011).

Hepp, A., Roitsch, C., & Berg, M. (2016) introduces the approach of contextualised communication network analysis as a qualitative procedure for researching communicative relationships realised through the media. It combines qualitative interviews on media appropriation, egocentric network maps, and media diaries. Through the triangulation of these methods of data collection, it is possible to gain a differentiated insight into the specific meanings, structures and processes of communication networks across a variety of media. The approach is illustrated using a recent study dealing with the mediatisation of community building among young people. In this context, the qualitative communication network analysis has been applied to distinguish "localists" from "centrists", "multilocalists", and "pluralists". These different "horizons of mediatised communitisation" are connected to distinct communication networks. Since this involves today a variety of different media, the contextual analysis of communication networks necessarily has to imply a cross-media perspective.

Oancea, A., Florez Petour, T., and Atkinson, J. (2017) noted a particular advantage of qualitative network analysis tools approach in its fit to the study of cultural value and impact in different disciplinary and institutional settings.

Sciences are policy sciences when they clarify the process of policy-making in society or supply data for the making of rational judgments on policy questions" Lasswell (1975). The 'art' of policy sciences, therefore, seek to improve decision-making by reinforcing and supporting human dignity to elide the blinders of instrumental reason by addressing the manifold of human experience (Hale, 2001). The personalities who significantly play vital roles in this field are the policy scientists and analysts who are involved in the scientific design, formulation, analysis, and evaluation of policies in particular and are concerned with the study of the policy-making process in general (Flor, 1991). Lasswell and McDougal called on "policy scientists to aid decision makers in clarifying goals, identifying trends relative to goals, analyzing the factors causing or contributing to specific trends, projecting the future, and inventing and evaluating policy proposals—alternative actions that may be taken related to the desired results." To ensure that policy scientists would be adequately equipped for these intellectual tasks, Lasswell and McDougal proposed educational training programs devoted to the knowledge and skills needed for better policy (decision) making: contextual thinking, problem orientation, and mastery of diverse methods.

To guide communication policy-makers in addressing challenges, Picard and Pickard (2017) proposed policy principles that aim to guide contemporary media and communications policymaking in democratic countries so the contributions of these operations and systems to society may be improved.   They maintain that "Media and communications policies are central to many of the social and political issues that societies face today." However, existing policies are often unable to respond to rapid technological, economic, political, and social developments because they address only particular media and communication challenges at a particular time.  On the other hand, fundamental principles are constant, thus providing guidance on how to respond to new concerns and challenges and making appropriate policies.

Picard and Pickard (2017) note that "policy principles are coherent statements based on underlying norms and values that help policymakers and organisations respond to issues and take part in legislative and regulatory activities". In practice, principles are articulated and then used to set policy objectives and determine the means to achieve them. The latter two stages opine Picard and Pickard (2017), are subjected to political processes that determine the final policy outcome.

Picard and Pickard (2017) therefore came up with the following rubric list of potential principles that they believe are crucial in crafting a much reflective communication policy:

 Meeting fundamental communication and content needs;
 Providing effective ability for public use of media and communications;
 Promoting diversity/plurality in ownership of media and content available;
 Affording protection for users and society;
 Providing transparency and accountability;
 Pursuing developmental and economic benefits; and
 Pursuing equitable and effective policy outcomes.

The authors (Picard and Pickard, 2017) disaggregated these key principles as follows:

Principles are therefore not neutral, because they are normative, reflecting specific values that are subject to contestation. In choosing among policy principles, Picard and Pickard (2017) assert that policymakers should optimally be concerned about effects of policy on all stakeholders, giving primacy to fundamental communication needs of society and seeking to balance social and economic benefit.

"Communication and Culture, Conflict and Cohesion" is a book edited by Alexander G. Flor (2002), an expert on Knowledge Management for Development, which discusses the need for convergence in society through inter-cultural communication, using case studies in Malaysia, Indonesia, and the Philippines. It also examines environmental conflicts, indigenous peoples, and the official development assistance in the Philippines. In the book, Flor noted that communication and culture are "inextricably linked". Societal conflict in this age of informatization is a "function of culture caused by a dysfunction of societal communication". The quality and degree of societal communication – the mass media and education—determine the ways that cultures are exposed to others. The higher the quality and degree of inter-cultural communication, the lower the propensity for conflict, and vice versa. He observed that many of the world's contemporary wars – in Rwanda, Basque, Bosnia, Kosovo, Chechnya, Afghanistan, Aceh, East Timor—are not being waged by national political struggles "but by cultures". For example, Catholic bishops and Islam ulama agree that the conflict in the island of Mindanao in the Philippines is triggered by "opposing value systems (on the use of natural resources), opposing social structures (feudal vs. oligarchic), and opposing worldviews (materialistic vs. idealistic)" – all of which, Flor noted, are components of culture. One of the first steps to help repair the situation is for communication policy scientists to "begin with tolerance as a short-term solution, and understanding as a long-term solution". Tolerance and understanding require "good communication" from both ends of the spectrum that are striving to achieve "mutual understanding" – the goal of Kincaid (1979) for communication in his Convergence Model. The concept of convergence looks at the communication process as cyclical between source and receiver, and interactive between their message and feedback. "With convergence comes cohesion." Mutual understanding achieved through communication helps preclude conflicts, and encourages cohesion among the world's cultures.

THE NEW POLICY SCIENCES

The policy sciences since Lasswell (1971 in Cairney & Weible, 2017), at its heart, still offers some inspiration, but it has not kept pace with new models of human choice and theories of the policy process. This problem has resulted partly from the unintended consequence of Lasswell's distinction between 'knowledge of' and 'knowledge in' the policy process. In others words, there is a major gap between the ways in the development and use of policy process theories and policy analysis tools. Consequently, policy analysis research is often conducted with an insufficient appreciation of basic science, and policy process research is often esoteric and detached from practice (Cairney & Weible, 2017).
A new policy sciences updates the language of the old to focus more on choice and contexts and embrace applied and basic science in conducting policy analysis and policy process research. The new policy sciences highlights 1.) knowing your policymaker audience and the context in which they operate. For example, policymaker's attention is fleeting and they engage emotionally with information, which limits the impact of a lengthy evidence-based analysis and puts the onus on policy analysts to tell a simple persuasive story. Further, given the changing landscape and the multitude of choices facing people engaged in the policy process, single-shot solutions will not work. Therefore, the best strategy as policy scholars is to offer people ways to think critically to help them learn and adapt while making choices and navigating the policy process taking note of its ultimate goal "to achieve a greater realization of human dignity and political equality (Cairney & Weible, 2017)."

The best way to structure the policy sciences is to direct the basic and applied science towards realistic depictions of choice in complex contexts. One cannot make people more rational, but one can establish choices from a mix of rationality and irrationality to help people adapt accordingly. One cannot make the context simpler, but one can offer multiple theoretical descriptions of its complexity and explanations of its key dynamics (Cairney & Weible, 2017).

The biggest contribution of the new policy sciences is to encourage critical thinking. Scholars can help actors in the policy process to ask better questions, identify assumptions and cognitive filters and biases, see the world through different viewpoints, recognize the strengths and limitations of information searches and networks, and better specify the source of successes and failures (Cairney & Weible, 2017).

Above all else, dispense with the idea of comparing real-world policymaking with the myth of comprehensively rational action, to advise people not to give up their bounded and irrational minds but to look for opportunities to learn and adapt their strategies to better achieve their goals. To make it happen, one needs to recognize the combined value of basic and applied science (Cairney & Weible, 2017).

The new policy sciences has one simple motto: "know your audience and their context." At the level of the individual, knowing what makes people tick, to identify their ways in which they engage emotionally with information and combine facts and emotions to make decisions. At the context level, although all audiences are embedded in decision-making venues, policy subsystems, and political systems, policy theories are used to make sense of complexity and that each theory only captures one piece of the puzzle. Therefore, a new agenda is highlighted but also recognized where there is insufficient knowledge to ensure complete success (Cairney & Weible, 2017).
In the end, the "new policy sciences can help policy makers, policy scholars, policy scientists, policy advocates, and development communication practitioners who are in to policy-making by using: (1) psychology and cognitive science to describe the art of choice, in which people use reliable short cuts to gather information to make good enough decisions and (2) multiple policy process theories to describe a policy context's ever-changing complexity. The best way to do this is to (3) combine applied and basic science in the field (Cairney & Weible, 2017).

NEW TOOLS FOR POLICY SCIENCES AND DEVELOPMENT COMMUNICATION

In a changing world communication about development challenges and advocacy for change have become increasingly complex. Navigating these challenges by offering insights and suggestions and new tools such as the rapid increase in the use of new and social media contrasted with the opportunities and risks it poses for development communication is helpful for various stakeholders such as policy makers.

Various literature suggest new methods for policy sciences and development communication. Sudeep Uprety's (2016) article entitled "Engaging Policy Audiences - The dynamics of development communications," talks about visibility in the current digital era. Development organizations must now have cameras along with other essentials. The project teams, along with the researchers, engineers, medics and logistics personnel, also now have people carrying camera, pen and paper. In other words, communication has become an integral component in the world of development.

Also, creativity is essential in development communications. Development organizations need to come up with unique ways of engaging audiences. Reaching the right audience- finding the engagement community (and communities) who will find your information useful is very critical. Acknowledging the limitations of diverse and sometimes hard-to-reach audiences, development organizations often engage communications and give them creative and artistic freedom, allowing them to come up with content that generates interest across a range of audiences – beyond the circle of those working in the field of development. Organizations aim to engage wider audiences with strong messages – linking local voices to the entire globe. Communications experts nowadays, apply the age-old art of story-telling, making their messages more visually interesting and exciting to hear about (Uprety, 2016).

Moreover, social media and online communications tools such as infographics and Graphics Interchange Format (GIF) videos have provided a great platform in terms of reaching out and engaging with a wide variety of audiences. This is useful for development communications practitioners to understand the extent of audience engagement with their content – be it a blog, a report, a video or an infographic- and mold their content and style of presentation accordingly (Uprety, 2016).

Furthermore, Development organizations are now focusing on the science of evidence uptake and knowledge management to synthesize project findings into user-friendly formats so that they are widely read with interest by various stakeholders. Simply put, the delivery of the right kind of message to the intended audience in the right manner, is required. These user-friendly evidence summaries and briefs are of particular importance for policy makers to give them a "trailer" (to use a movie-based analogy) of what the research/project is about (Uprety, 2016).

With the changing dynamics of internet and communications, the world of development is developing, therefore delivering key messages is also constantly evolving and adapting. In this continuous evolution, the core of any successful communication strategy is still the resonance and relevance of the message itself and, essentially, its ability to touch hearts and lives.

Taeihagh (2017) discussed crowdsourcing as rapidly evolving and applied in situations where ideas, labor, opinion or expertise of large groups of people is used. Crowdsourcing is now used in various policy-making initiatives such as in open collaboration platforms and specific stages of the policy process (agenda-setting and policy evaluations). Crowdsourcing is a considered a new tool for policy-making and the nuances of the technology and its use and implications for different stages of the policy process is explored. The study highlights the role of crowdsourcing, its impact as a policy tool or as a technological enabler and the current trends and future directions of crowdsourcing.

Kerschberg (2012) also talks about the power of crowdsourcing in developing regions. There is optimism in a nascent paradigm shift of the realities of a poverty-stricken community. Data flow has the power to effect change, not only politically and socially, but on more fundamental levels such as living standards and sheer survival. Most enjoy the benefits of digital technology to share and collate data. For years, Google flu trends allow people to prepare for flu outbreaks, either in the home or in the emergency room. When those services are placed in those areas that need them most, the potential is overwhelming. By supplying someone in a developing region with the physical means to access data, one not only automatically brings them into the loop of communication, but also introduces them into a whole new business infrastructure powered by crowdsourcing methodologies.

With all these new literature on policy sciences, now is a great time to work on more policy engagements in development communication and achieving development goals.

Communication policy science 
The atmosphere of participation created by recent administrations has brought about a more significant role for the development communication specialist/ policy scientist. His involvement in communication policymaking is facilitated by the so-called institutionalization of people power. His expertise may be directly tapped by the most important stakeholder, the media consumer. The participation of information users and media consumers in policy making may be realized by the formation of a nationwide media consumer's organization or a federation of local organizations of this nature in which policy analysts play a significant role. This proposed organization could initiate media education in the formal and non-formal modes. Media education at the formal level may be facilitated by lobbying for the inclusion of such in existing secondary and tertiary curricula. Non-formal education may be conducted through media consumer sponsored awareness campaigns. This organization could also conduct its own audience related studies and policy research. It could establish a nationwide network involving the church, academic communities, grassroots organizations and cause-oriented groups. Communication policy scientists may also serve as part of the staff of our legislators in the Congress and Senate. In their private capacities, they can form research and development outfits or "think tanks" whose services may be availed of by government agencies. Indeed, now is a fortuitous time for policy engagement in development communication.

Culture, politics, economics and technology have an impact on policy decisions.  In order to investigate the factors that influence communications policy, one has to go beyond conventional views of media and communication and should combine these with policy studies.

According to experts, communication policy science would be understood if the public just had access to the right scientific information. Coyle, in his article "Theory of Development Communication", articulates that people have options to change their ways of life through communication. People improve their lives and ways of thinking through communication, sharing their perspectives and understanding what is going on in their surroundings. As highlighted by Flor, communication development has something to do with policy science as these are anchored for improving policy making.

As stipulated in Walt Rostow's theory in Boado's article, societies progress through specific stages of development on their way to modernity. Policy makers and scientists can communicate directly with the public through social media and blogging. By using social media outlets such as Twitter and Facebook, policymakers and scientists can serve as critical mediators in disseminating scientific information by sharing advancements directly with society.

Communication policy and its dimensions

Citing an article, "Dimensions of an Information and Communication Policy": "for a national policy to be effective, it must attempt to be comprehensive, covering issues that are considered relevant for that particular society". Because it involves communication, the use of many forms is deemed important, such as traditional and indigenous cultural forms, print media, electronic/broadcast media, film, cinema among others. Such communication policy must be centered on development, in transforming the lives of marginalized people. Development encompasses economic benefits, health improvement, education and other transformative agents. The process involves people empowerment in identifying goals, needs, and solutions to various challenges. Thus, communication policy that is national in scope has broad objective dimensions as well as specific areas where community needs are addressed. Intervention of communication strategies such as dissemination of information both mediated and personal where the latter constitutes participatory communication is deemed important.

John A.R. Lee, author of Towards Realistic Communication Policies: Recent Trends and Ideas Compiled and Analysed, published by The Unesco Press, shares that every state or nation carries communication policies. These policies are stated/embedded in "legislation, conditions, codes of conduct, rules and proceedings" or implied/suggested "in accepted practices." He adds that they are present "at the national, institutional and professional levels."

By citing a Unesco report made by experts on communication and planning, Lee defines communication policies as "sets of principles and norms established to guide the behaviour of communication systems."

He adds that the dimensions of communication policies as well as communication planning encompass the communication system, its components and structures; the functions of the system; the "clients" or audience using the system; the types of information carried by the system and its components; the values and qualities of the information content; and a variety of considerations about the system, its functions, audience, types of information and qualities. Members of the audience are classified based on such characteristics as age, sex, occupations, socio-economic strata, urban-rural (locations) and persuasions. Types of information refer to the conversation, cultural forms, data, education, entertainment, general information, music, news and opinion. Meanwhile, truth, objectivity, relevance, educational effectiveness, violence, humour, sex, libel are examples of values and qualities of the information content.

According to Lee, the "consideration, identification and determination" of the scope of specific communication systems and societal principles and norms are needed in formulating communication policies.

In his paper, Lee also discusses participation in the formulation of communication policies by asking, "Who is involved?" and identifying the stakeholders. They are government executive, legislative bodies, authorities in charge of social and economic planning, individual ministries and their planning boards, communication enterprises, professional organizations, the citizen, the social scientist and the economist.

E. Lloyd Sommerland, UNESCO Regional Communication Adviser for Asia, points out the difference between communication policies and communication planning by saying that the former provides "the principles, rules and guidelines on which the communication system is built," while the latter is concerned with the policy implementation.

He shares that every country engages in development planning that touches different sectors of a society like "agriculture, manufacturing, commerce, education, health, transport and communication, social and community services." At the heart of these plans for development is communication. "Communication is part and parcel of this whole process of development and needs its own infrastructure," said Summerland. The word "communication" in this particular context includes telecommunications, mass media (print and broadcast), face-to-face communication and traditional channels and these are resources tapped by a society "to enable information to flow within it", he adds.

The author emphasizes the role of communication in national development.

Sommerland also underlines that communication policies are not the ends and they provide a framework for action. He makes a reference to what a UNESCO expert group has said that behind these policies is strategic planning.

"(It) determines the alternative ways to achieve long-range goals and sets the frame of reference for shorter-range operational planning. Strategic planning translates into quantified targets and systematic approaches, the general objectives of communication policies," he says.

Sommerland also supports some claims of Lee that communication policies are either embedded or implied in the existing policies of a nation.

"For a country to try and formulate a coherent national communication policy does not, of course, imply that no policies in this area already exist," the former says. "...Because communication is interdisciplinary and because it is the thread which binds a nation together, communication policies even if incomplete and implicit, are to be found in many different parts of a political and social system.

Development communication and policy sciences as mutually constitutive fields 
Development communication and policy sciences exhibits mutuality as catalysts of change in this fluid environment. Both are geared towards effecting change in society. Will these two sciences be robustly beneficial if converged in one developmental framework? Allen (as cited in Flor, 1991) postulates that policy is a science of decision-making based on empirical data gathered from observation. One important characteristic of policies is, it is created to facilitate civic order, an agent to development process. How does it relate to development communication? Although a relatively young science, Development Communication has now been recognized and adopted by various agencies: the government and private sector as a means to institute effective changes using bottom-up approach. In the same vein, policy sciences grew out of this need to reorient actively the social sciences to the resolution of policy issues. Recognizing that every human being is a value-shaper and sharer in the social process, interaction as whole has been considered systemically by both sciences. A policy science is anchored on its intelligence function, followed by mobilization and bureaucratic reforms where mobilization is a key component of development communication. Development communication practitioners are well-equipped when it comes to understanding social phenomena which can aid in the intelligence function of policy scientists. The development agenda of both sciences are anchored on contextuality, meaning both recognizes the human's social values and institutions in drafting interventions, plans and policies to achieve an enlightened society.

These policies are products of Development Communication initiatives that can influence decision makers or the government in enacting pertinent laws for the benefit of the publics. Development communication's process is akin to policy science as both recognizes the context or the environment where humans socially interact. Both are using social science procedures in solving large-scale problems and further acknowledges communication as an integral part of the process. Hence one can surmise that policy decision-making is dependent on communication.

In an era of rapid development, each field should not be viewed as dialectically superior against the other, rather both development communication and policy sciences should mutually work to advance for the social change. The thrusts and goals of Development communication can be sustainable if it is backed by certain policies.

Following Quebral's definition of Development communication "the art and science of human communication applied to speedy transformation of a country and the mass of its people from poverty to dynamic state of economic growth that makes possible greater social equality and the larger fulfillment of human potential", Flor and Ongkiko explained each aspect of this definition for better understanding on why development communication was defined this way.

ART

In relaying a message, creativity is needed to attract the attention of its audience. It does not focus only on beautifying the message or the image but the art of communicating with people that would help them understand and adapt to the changes that will happen to them.

SCIENCE

As Flor and Ongkiko emphasize, development communication is a social science. At the same time, it is both theory and practices. The theory is backed-up with science in order to understand a situation, then the application or execution of plans towards development is the practice. A systematic approach which mostly based on the methods of science is followed in order to address a situation. The most commonly used method is identifying the problem, gathering data about the problem and develop communication processes that will be useful in able to address the situation and helped the community for development.

HUMAN COMMUNICATION

This is an important aspect for development communication because it is people-centred. The people need to communicate with one another for their own development. The people behind the development is reaching out to the people who need development. That is human communication.

SPEEDY TRANSFORMATION

This represents the social change that will happen to the community. All the researches made in able to identify the problem must put into action for the transformation of the lives of the people in the community.

POVERTY

The greatest challenge in development communication is poverty. Even in the Millennium Development Goals of United Nations, poverty is at the top of the list that needs to address with the hope of eradicating it in the future. Because of poverty, many people are experiencing malnutrition, unemployment and illiteracy which adds to the burden of the people.

DYNAMIC STATE OF ECONOMIC GROWTH, GREATER SOCIAL EQUALITY, LARGER FULFILLMENT OF HUMAN POTENTIAL

Since the goal is for development, this is a continuous process. The aim is to help the people with their economic, social, and environmental goals.

Noticeably, everything that was mentioned in the explanation of the definition of development communication has something to do with goals, progress, theory, research, problem identification, and practices. Thomas L. McPhail, also describes development communication as a process of change using education or media as long as it is for the purpose of positive social change.

This coincides with Harold Lasswell's vision that policy sciences bring together social sciences and practical policymaking to solve public problems, formalizing the link between the two.

As mentioned, development communication is backed with science through theories by identifying the problems needed to address. Lasswell identified policy science as problem-solving, with the idea of when addressing the problems, it should focus on human dignity or the fulfilment of human potential as Quebral said on her definition of development communication.

NATIONAL DEVELOPMENT

According to Jaime B. Ramirez (2011), members of the development media have considered economic and social development as one of the significant and vital signs of national development. Admittedly, he said, development communication cam always bridge gaps between the traditional and modern changing society, as it can raise the full aspirations of the people under the new society in the overall strategy for change.  Development communication accordingly, can enforce social norms. In terms of policy sciences, development communication Ramirez adds, can broaden the policy dialogue by providing the two-way flow of information and opinion required for development as a nation. It, therefore, plays a potent and major role to economic and social development as well as political power. Without sacrificing its freedom, the development media can contribute to the growth of democratic institutions and to political stability, essential to national development.

Social marketing and social mobilization for development 
In the aim to address and solve the myriad of societal problems of various contexts, the policy sciences are important to be able to have a more structured operational and strategic plan. In view of this, the role of social marketing and social mobilization are deemed necessary to achieve the goal of the policy sciences by purposively crafting and implementing target-specific plans and programs for positive societal change.

Social marketing (soc mar) and social mobilization (soc mob) are utilized to facilitate development (Velasco, Cadiz, and Lumanta, 1999). Development, as defined by Gonzales (n.d.), is "a quest for an improved quality of life for all." Moreover, Gonzales (n.d.) describes development as multidimensional (possesses political, economic, social, cultural, institutional, and environmental dimensions), multidisciplinary (draws from various disciplines), interdisciplinary (derives comprehensive, strategic, and operational plans for implementation from relationships between and among disciplines), and integrative (unifies diverse orientation to allow inter-penetration among disciplines).
Therefore, the mobilization of people and resources is essential in the quest for development. "True development is people oriented and participatory, bringing about people empowerment. It uses technology in harmony with the environment. It aims to be relevant, responsive, effective, efficient, economical, equitable, and sustainable" (Gonzales in Velasco, Cadiz, and Lumanta, 1999).

Social marketing versus social mobilization 
Social marketing uses different strategies to market social ideas and values that aim to create a change in behavior. Whereas, social mobilization has a much broader scope and it encompasses social marketing and communication. Social mobilization aims to bring together individuals and groups in spreading awareness about a certain cause using social marketing strategies. Social marketing is implemented when an advocacy/cause/message needs to be crafted in a way that it will effectively reach certain groups of people or target markets.

Kotler and Zaltman (in McKee, 1992) define social marketing as "the design, implementation, and control of program calculated to influence the acceptability of social ideas, involving considerations of product, pricing, communications, and market research." On the other hand, McKee (1992) described social mobilization as "the process of bringing together all feasible and practical inter-sectoral and social allies to raise people's awareness of the demand for a particular development program, to assist in the delivery of resources and services, and to strengthen community participation for sustainability and self reliance."

Social marketing hand-in-hand with social mobilization 
Social marketing and social mobilization combined creates a more powerful movement as both elements strengthen each other. Social mobilization prompts the use of social marketing strategies to attain the main objectives of a program. Likewise, social marketing intensifies social mobilization as it upholds a people-centered approach in putting together activities through the use of different media, in achieving the development goal. As an illustration, the interplay of social marketing and social mobilization is manifested in the corporate social responsibility (CSR) programs of different organizations.

Strategic communication for sustainable development 
"Communication is a key factor to begin and keep a proper Sustainable Development strategy" (Bucur and Petra, 2011). Development Communication can be defined as a "dialogue-based process entailing the strategic application of communication approaches, methods and/or technologies for social change". This definition highlights the three important features of development communication – process, analytical activity based on dialogue, and aims to achieve change. Strategic Communication is essential in encouraging public participation and achieving effective policy making. It affects goal setting, decision making, development and implementation, and impact assessment. However, communication as a strategic tool remains deficient in development programs creating the need to establish an Interest Group on Strategic Communication for Sustainable Development. Strategic communication "aims at the innovative and sustainable change of practices, behaviors and lifestyles, guides communication processes and media interventions within and among social groups".
An effective strategy for sustainable development integrates the vision and action plan of the government, civil society and the private sector. The World Bank views development communication as the "integration of strategic communication in development projects" based on a clear understanding of indigenous realities. The Swedish International Development Cooperation Agency is now recognizing the value of implementing strategic communication to support development initiatives. This is aligned with the long tradition of strategic communication initiatives used in development projects related to human rights, democracy, poverty alleviation and health aimed at generating awareness, promoting behavioral changes, affording mobilization, and creating partnerships to reach common goals.

Gender 

Development communication efforts, along with other development strategies, have failed to improve the conditions of women on a global scale, and when compared with men, women are disproportionately subject to poverty, illiteracy, domestic violence, discrimination, and barriers to senior professional positions, even in development organizations (Harbour & Twist, 1996). As a group that is marginalized from global, national, and community power structures, Wilkins (1999) contends that women tend to constitute a target more often than a participant in the production of development communication. Moore (1995) estimated that "gender" made its "first discursive appearance" in development institutions during the 1960s (p. 43). However, it was not until 1975 that women's contributions to the development process were formally acknowledged by the United Nations (UN). The mid-1970s marked a shift in attention to women in development, along with other critical transitions in the field of development communication (Rogers, 1976; Schramm & Lerner, 1976). A WID strategy advocated including women as an explicit focus in order to achieve development goals (Dagenais & Piché, 1994). In 1975, WID was placed on a global agenda when the UN sponsored a conference in Mexico City to launch the Year of Women. This facilitated the designation of the Decade for the Advancement of Women (1976 until 1985). As a discourse, WID served to organize principles for the production of knowledge about women by states, institutions, and communities (Escobar, 1995, p. 210). WID construed women as actively contributing to society through their economic production and human reproduction (Staudt, 1985). WID also pointed to a need to improve women's access to education, employment, and political participation (Valdivia, 1996), conditions considered in earlier models of modernization that tended to privilege male constituents. Throughout the Decade for the Advancement of Women however, several scholars recognized limits to using media to promote social change, such as problematic stereotypes of women in media texts, a lack of women's employment in positions of power in media industries, and poor access to mediated technologies as a source of information, particularly among rural women.
Following the Decade for Women, attention to WID gradually shifted toward a concern with gender and development (GAD). This shift from "women" to "gender" resonates with an understanding of gender as a socially constructed category, rather than essentializing sex as a biological condition (Dagenais & Piché, 1994). GAD attempted to position women as active agents of social change situated within social and structural systems of patriarchy and power (Dagenais & Piché, 1994). Steeves (1993) drew attention to critical scholarship about the political economy of communication and participatory approaches to development (Freire, 1983) to propose the creation of a global, imagined feminist community that challenges power relations. A "global feminist" approach to development would critique what appears to be defining gender according to reproductive capacity in a way that promotes motherhood as a universal role for women, rather than celebrating diversity in women's intentions, experiences, backgrounds, and capabilities.

Hooda and Singh (2012) note that the most significant and longest social movement continuing is the movement for the emancipation of women. However, the primary goal for women empowerment is to improve the quality of life of women, but also has deep ramifications in social, economic and political scenario of body polity. It is such contentions that stressing the need to recognize power dimensions within women's domestic, professional, and social contexts, GAD proponents would advocate interventions designed to change structures or norms.

Development communication activity embodies models of social change that are implemented across political and cultural boundaries wherein, issues of gender, communication, and development are grounded in global structures and processes of power, which condition access to and acquisition of economic and social resources. Watkins (1999) notes that in as much as critical scholars have described the global domination of media systems by Western and corporate agencies, gender also factors into this equation, as the extensive documentation of the tendency of media industries to trivialize women's roles and concerns has been historically demonstrated (van Zoonen, 1994). Early scholars of development communication did not explicitly address the role of gender in their discussions of media and modernity (Watkins, 1999, p. 48). However, an examination of their work illustrates implicit assumptions made about men's and women's roles in the development process.  There is thus a need to understand the dynamics contributing to the institutional construction of gender within development communication strategies designed to alleviate social problems. Watkins (1999) cites Steeves (1993) whose summary of feminist scholarship concluded that, among other areas, research is needed "on women's roles and representations in Third World development communication activities, including funding agency projects" (p. 120). Along with integrating regional, national, and/or organizational perspectives, one specific tool for policymakers is ensuring that gender perspective is incorporated into policies. Regardless whether gender plays a central role in a development communication policy, the policy-making process has to be taken in a deliberate way to address concerns of both women and men. When views of different groups of women and men in policy formation and delivery are taken accordingly, misjudging of the different effects on each group, and the systems and organizations that support them can be avoided.

In a quest to ensure that the overall legal and policy framework is promoting gender equality, more than just adopting laws that explicitly provide for gender equality can be done. Thus it is essential that all laws and policies reflect gender equality considerations, through a process called gender mainstreaming. Gender mainstreaming is the mechanism to ensure a gender-sensitive approach to policy making.

Gender mainstreaming, according to the United Nations, is a globally accepted strategy for promoting gender equality. Mainstreaming is not an end in itself but a strategy, an approach, a means to achieve the goal of gender equality. Mainstreaming involves ensuring that gender perspectives and attention to the goal of gender equality are central to all activities—policy development, research, advocacy/ dialogue, legislation, resource allocation, and planning, implementation and monitoring of programmes and projects. A strong, continued commitment to gender mainstreaming is one of the most effective means for the United Nations to support promotion of gender equality at all levels—in research, legislation, policy development and in activities on the ground, and to ensure that women as well as men can influence, participate in and benefit from development efforts.

United Nations Children's Fund or UNICEF also promotes gender sensitivity in its policies. UNICEF gender review ensures that gender is mainstreamed in all UNICEF's projects and programs as well as in its work with partners. UNICEF also ensures that the monitoring and evaluation tools are gender sensitive and that every staff is aware of the UN Code of conduct. UNICEF also uses the Harmonized Gender and Development Guidelines (HGAD) as a tool to promote gender equality and women's empowerment in the development and implementation of projects.

The communication approach embedded within empowerment models combines the use of appropriate media. This means using a variety of channels ranging from indigenous media, local and international media systems. (Einsiedel 1996).

Demography 
Defined as the statistical study of populations, Demography is seen as more of a general science that can analyze populations that show change over a period of time. However, in combination with the more specific aspect of communication that has to do with social sciences, demographics can be a significant factor and consequently influencer of Development Communication policy design. Population changes are brought about by birth, migration and mortality. These demographic processes affect the use of resources, nation-building and society formation, and cultural development calling for development communication policies.

Researcher for the Max Planck Institute for Demographic Research Sebastian Klüsener "investigated how the exchange of ideas and information between people could affect the development of spatial, temporal, and social differences in demographic change. The results highlight that communication plays a much larger role in shaping demographic processes..." In her discussion of the relationship between communicators and their audiences, Natalie T. J. Tindall, an associate professor in the department of communication at Georgia State University, US, shares "Demographic categories can still tell us a lot about our social structure, and continue to be useful for macro-level understandings of people and societies." It is with this understanding that policies can be designed more tailor-fit to those it is designed for.
Furthermore, the criterion by which a demography is performed are relevant factors that may act as a roadmap that can guide development communication policy making. This includes but is not limited to age, level of education, gender distribution profile, individual and household income, etc. With the anticipatory objective of policy sciences in relation to crisis or problem solving, the better policy makers get a grasp of how a population is demographically—not just socially—the more sensitive and pro-active policy making as a process can be. When perspectives of an accurate cross-sectional sampling of a population, group, or culture are taken into consideration, the ensuing policies are better geared towards the pre-set objectives. Scalone, Dribe, and Klusener have further found that "Communication can significantly increase the impact of population-relevant policies and other processes of social change..." which reinforces the idea that as a science in itself, development communication policy design, becomes more accurate and purposeful when the correct information and variables are holistically integrated.

Selected approaches to communication planning for policy development 
UNESCO or the United Nations Educational, Scientific, and Cultural Organization is one of the multilateral organizations that uses communication planning for policy development.  In one of its publications back in 1980 "Approaches to Communication Planning," where it presents some of the most common approaches that scholars, planners and professionals to use.  Below are common approaches to communication planning.

Process approach 
The process approach deals directly with the communication planning process which deals to the theories within the planning process that asserts that planning is the application of theory on how and why they are used.  (UNESCO, 1980) The second is it deals with the planning process itself that provide alternative ways of organizing the planning function and process, given different purposes and planning contexts.  (UNESCO, 1980) The thrust of the argument is that there are alternatives to the widely known rational/comprehensive planning approach (UNESCO, 1980).

Communication policy makers are not acting in isolation; they had the full support of scientist and theorists. Communication for Development aims at upholding change in people's attitudes and behavior so as to increase their participation in the development process.  Rogers' diffusion of innovations theory is perhaps the most influential theory in the modernization paradigm. The diffusion model gained wide currency in most developing nations and still looms large with the agenda to support 'development' by "informing the populations about the development projects, illustrating their advantages and recommending that they be supported"(Servaes, 1996). Communication within the modernization approach is synonymous to information and ignores the importance of feedback in the communication process. Melkote and Steeves (2001) contributed three key qualities of modernization theory and practice: blaming the victim, Social Darwinism, and sustaining class structure of inequality. (1) Blaming the victim is an ideological process, an almost painless circumvention among policy-makers and intellectual all over the world. It is a process of justifying inequality in society by finding defects in the victims of inequality. The policymakers simply blame the despondent lives led by the poor in Third World countries and it is being attributed to the lack of motivation and access to information relating to the various social and economic aspects that they need in order to redeem themselves. (2) Social Darwinists believed that government interventions on behalf of the poor would have disastrous results since they would interfere with the laws of natural selection. The theorist believed that outside interventions to address matters concerning the poor would have dreadful results since these would be interfering with a natural course of events and individual choices and rights. (3) Sustaining class structure of inequality, this is a capitalist interest and quite difficult to overcome. The effect of a focus on individual level cultural deficiencies has been to sustain the status quo within and between unequal societies and thus delay change.

Systems approach 

The systems approach in communication planning deals on how to establish new systems within organizations (UNESCO, 1980). This approach is valuable to planners faced with the task of setting up organizational systems to carry out communication functions (UNESCO, 1980). This approach can also be best applied to problems in the environment, providing planners with an analytical perspective on problem analysis and a range of techniques to use in implementing this perspective (UNESCO, 1980).

Network approach 

Network approach (Padovani & Pavan, 2014) is a heuristic framework for theorizing and empirically investigating global communication governance (GCG) environments or networks in supranational settings characterized by plurality and multiplicity of agents, actors and stakeholders, plurality and diversity of cultures, complexity of interactions, plurality of political systems, and multiplicity of policy processes. GCG is a term coined by Padovani & Pavan (2014) to "indicate the multiplicity of networks of interdependent but operationally autonomous actors that are involved with different degrees of autonomy and power, in processes of formal or informal character, through which they pursue different goals, produce relevant knowledge and cultural practices, and engage in political negotiation while trying to influence the outcome of decision-making in the domain of media and communication in transnational context" (p. 544). Network approach specifically focuses on the transnational dynamics that govern communication systems.

Policy life cycle 

Government officials and policy makers in both developed and developing countries are often confronted with problems for which they have no design solutions. Every problem, country and culture requires a specific approach and seems to go through policy life cycle. Winsemius proposed four phases of policy cycle;
Phase 1: Recognizing the problem; groups in the society such as government official, lobbyists and countries' leaders recognize the problem, e.g. terrorism, poverty, global warming, and other. The problem is made known to all stakeholders, during this stage the members realized that problem should be tackled through policy.
Phase 2: Gaining Control over the Problem; at this point, the government start to advance in their mechanisms through the formulation of policies. Policy oriented research is often appointed to scientific institutions, opinion surveys are piloted, and options for improving and solving the problem are accounted.
Phase 3: Solving the Problem; at this stage, policies, programs and projects are implemented. In most cases, the government will manage all the details of a program by itself but the best scenario is when NGOs and other involved groups participate in the initiatives.
Phase 4: Monitoring the Problem: At this point the focus is to ensure that the problem is under control and must remain so. This is also the time to think about future policies and to develop public and private partnerships in implementing policies.

Interdisciplinary research for policy and practice 
Policy analysis has traditionally followed a linear model – problem identification, policy formulation, legislation, implementation, evaluation, and iteration. However, in solving complex socio-economic problems, a more interdisciplinary approach to societal problems may be more effective particularly for research topics of interdisciplinary nature (e.g., women's studies, environment) or those relevant to policy or strategic issues – drawing from different disciplines to enhance understanding of particular issues or for concept development. The main interest of interdisciplinary research for policy and practice is description, prediction, and ultimately social action. In interdisciplinary research, different disciplines interact and work together at each and every stage of the research process – from conceptualisation, research design and methodology, data analysis and interpretation into policy development.

Methods in communication policy analysis 
Ongkiko and Flor (2006) argue that a development communication specialist (DCS), at one time or another, also assumes the role of a communication policy analyst in Communication Policy Analysis 'because of his proactive posture and his preoccupation with purpose' (Flor, 1991). Remember that policy sciences anticipates, and looks forward, thus, substantiates the proactive nature of a DCS. In order to fully act out this role, there is a need for a rudimentary knowledge of methods in policy analysis, particularly those related to development communication. Among these methods are discussed below:

Communication technology assessment (CTA) 
Communication plays a vital role in project coordination, management, knowledge collection and transfer among different project shareholders (Malone & Crowston, 1994; Espinosa & Carmel, 2003, as cited by Gill, Bunker, & Seltsikas, 2012). CTA is a qualitative method that seeks to determine the higher and lower order impacts of specific forms of communication technology on the individual and society (Flor, 1991) prior to the adoption of new technology (Ongkiko & Flor, 2006). The decision to adopt or not depends on the findings of the assessment. CTA is forward-looking and adopts certain value premises on what is socially beneficial or detrimental to society. Being anticipatory in nature, CTA forecasts, at least on a probabilistic basis, the full spectrum of possible consequences of technological advance, leaving to the political process the actual choice among the alternative policies in the light of the best available knowledge of their likely consequences (Brooks, 1976, as cited by Ely, Zwanenberg, & Stirling, 2010). In this case, it should provide an unbiased analysis and information concerning the physical, biological, economic, social, and political effects of [communication] technologies.

Cost-Benefit Analysis 
Introduced by Jules Dupuit in the 1840s, French engineer and economist, the cost benefit analysis is a methodology used in policy analysis as a way of weighing up projects costs and benefits, to determine whether to go ahead with a project

Beyea (1999), identifies the types of cost analysis used in policy making to aid decision process. These are: Cost-Benefit analysis, Cost-effectiveness, cost-utilization and cost utility.

Social cost-benefit analysis 
Pathak (n.d.) explains that Social Cost Benefit Analysis (SCBA) is also referred to as Economic Analysis (EA). SCBA or EA is a feasibility study of a project from the viewpoint of a society to evaluate whether a proposed project will add benefit or cost to the society (Ibid.). Ongkiko and Flor (2006) further elaborate that SCBA is a quantitative method which attaches monetary values on social conditions brought by certain communication policies. Flor (1991) explains the monetary value of the social costs is subtracted from the social benefits of a particular program or policy. A positive difference is required for a program or policy to be adjudged as socially beneficial. The purpose of SCBA is to assist public decision-making, not in terms of producing the ideal project but simply by proposing the optimum solution for the community out of the spectrum of possibilities (Dupuis, 1985). Hence, the objective is to determine optimum quantities as a contribution to decision-making or to evaluate the effectiveness of decisions already taken.

Problematique analysis 
The problematique analysis procedure is a naturalistic approach that seeks to discover the influential factors and describe the structure of problems that exist in communication systems (Librero, 1993; Flor, 1991). The basic purpose of this approach, according to Librero (1993), is to identify the problem rather than the solution. In the process, therefore, the evaluator employing problematique analysis identifies the factors that influence the system, shows the hierarchical relationships of these factors and traces the root causes of the problems of the system. Flor (1991) classified these influential factors as either subordinate or superordinate, with the former being merely the symptoms of the latter. The identification of the superordinate influential factors or the root causes, then, prevents the recurrence of the problem situation.

"Problematique" situation occurs when certain recurring problems come about due to the fact that symptoms are treated but not the root cause of such problems. When 'superordinate influential factors', root causes of problems, are identified and given focus, real solutions come about. This is done through a 'problematic map' (Librero, 1998), perceived as basic tool for problem analysis that basically identifies the root causes which can be the bases for forming solutions.

Scenario construction 
As a policy analysis tool, scenario construction (SC) describes a possible set of future conditions (Moniz, 2006) or hypothetical events that may occur in the future of a particular system (Allen, 1978, as cited by Flor, 1991). It has also been defined as a description of the conditions and events under which some system being studied is assumed to be operating (Kraemer, 1973, as cited by Flor, 1991). Scenarios provide an educated description of one of many possible futures of a system, usually presented at the most optimistic or "best-case" state and the most pessimistic or "worst-case" state. According to Moniz (2006), the most useful scenarios are those that display the conditions of important variables over time. In this approach, the quantitative underpinning enriches the narrative evolution of conditions or evolution of variables; narratives describe the important events and developments that shape the variables. In terms of innovative methods for policy analysis, the foresight and scenario construction methods can be an interesting reference for social sciences (Moniz, 2006). Citing Allen (1978), Flor (1991) enumerates six steps in scenario construction, namely: (1) defining the system; (2) establishing a time period for the system to operate; (3) defining the external constraints on the environment of the system; (4) defining the elements or events within the system that are likely to increase or decrease the chances of the system's meeting its goals and objectives; (5) stating in probabilistic terms the likelihood of the occurrence of the elements or events; and (6) conducting a sensitive analysis of the results.

Policy Delphi 
The Policy Delphi, according to Flor (1991), is a variation of the Delphi technique. It is a tool for the analysis of policy issues seeking the involvement and participation of anonymous respondents (usually representatives of the different stakeholders of the policy). Herein, the desirability and feasibility of certain policies are assessed from the points of view of the different stakeholders. Meanwhile, according to Turoff (1975), the policy Delphi aims to create the best possible contrasting insights to resolve a major policy problem. Herein, the decision maker is interested on having a group that will give him options and supporting evidences where he can choose from for him to make a solution, rather than having a group that will produce the decision for him. "The Policy Delphi is, then, a tool for the analysis of policy issues and not a mechanism for making a decision" (Turoff, 1975). Turoff (1975) notes the challenging nature of policy Delphi as a means for policy analysis, "both for the design team and for the respondents" (Turoff, 1975). As a process, the policy Delphi undergoes the following six phases: (1) Formulating the issue; (2) Citing options; (3) Deciding preliminary stance about the issue; (4) Searching and getting reasons for disputes; (5) Assessing the underlying reasons; (6) Reassessing the options.

As a methodology, Delphi is used for structuring a group communication process so that the process is effective in allowing a group of individuals, as a whole, to deal with a complex problem. As mentioned, one of the advantages of this technique is the involvement of stakeholders in the analysis which is imperatively instrumental in building a consensus among people who will be/are affected by the policy/project. In the Philippines, this has also been well applied in a study conducted by Dr. Alexander Flor and Dr. Felix Librero in the Southeast Asian Needs Assessment for a Global Open Agriculture and Food University. Recently, Haynes, Palermo and Reidlinger(2016) adopted a Delphi modified technique(James Lind Alliance Approach) in their study in exploring obesity prevention in Australia.

Flor (1991) emphasizes the incorporation of divergent stakeholders in communication policy making. That the State is not a lone actor in the creation of public policies as noted by the various stakeholders identified by Flor (1991), attesting to the fact that State actions do not occur in an empty space. Consumer involvement to policy making can therefore of paramount importance in helping create relevant policies vis-à-vis Gatung's (1979) postulation of policies promoting "horizontalization where exchanges occur between the centers and peripheries "on more equal terms"." In this regard, employing appropriate methods in policy research such would be necessary in 'light of the diversity of stakeholders involved, there is a possibility to broaden the scope of 'expertise' to share opinion across diverse perspectives including local communities' (Haynes, et al., 2016). Employing the Modified Policy-Delphi technique to crafting an all-inclusive communication policy include the following jusutification:
 The Policy-Delphi technique ability to explore consensus and dissent, rather than aiming to achieve consensus,
 As a flexible technique, it can be applied to various situations to map overlapping priorities from different perspectives and identify mutual priorities across stakeholder groups and therefore is a valuable exercise for investigating complex public issues
 The technique facilitates an in-depth investigation which may detect limitations, considerations and consequences of policy options which may enhance the value and success of policy implementation.
 The diversity of stakeholders involved makes reaching consensus on priorities less feasible but where mapping perspectives may identify mutual concepts behind the most agreeable options to inform future research and practice.
 The technique provides an opportunity for participants to contribute equally, and offers additional options and comments throughout; in this respect, it gives all participants, including consumers, a voice in the complex debate [equity in 'Voices']
The methodology outlined in Haynes et al. (2016) paper align with Servaes (1986) reference to the application of Participatory Communication (Research) from a Freirean Perspective by positing that for dialectical and emancipatory process of action and reflection that constitutes the "process of conscientization, where an agenda instead of defined by an academic elite and programs enacted by a bureaucratic elite for the benefit of an economic or political elite, participatory research involves people gaining an understanding of their situation, confidence and an ability to change that situation" (Servaes, 1986). Therefore, the notion of Participatory Communication stresses the importance of cultural identity of local communities, and of democratisation and participation at all levels – international, national, local and individual. It points to a strategy, not merely inclusive of, but largely emanating from, the traditional 'receivers'. However one needs not to romanticize the use of such 'equity' methods. Sarveas(1986) had outlined the following caution:
 Participatory research can all too easily be utilized as yet another tool of manipulation by vested interests.
 While the approach strives towards empowerment, challenges existing structures, and is consequently ideological, rigidly prescribed ideologies must be avoided
 In addition, knowledge and perspective gained may well empower exploitative economic and authoritarian interests instead of local groups.
 Far from helping the process of liberation, if the researcher is not careful, he or she may only enable the traditional policy-makers and vested interests to present their goods in a more attractive package.
 Even the best intentioned researcher/activist can inadvertently enhance dependency rather than empowerment. If she/he enters communities with ready-made tools for analyzing reality, and solving problems, the result will likely be that as far as those tools are successful, dependency will simply be moved from one tyrant to another".

Simulations and modelling 
Simulations and modelling recently become a useful tool policy analysis involving computers and software in creating a virtual representation of the scenario. Because it offers a systems view of the situation, the analyst or researcher can monitor how the players or variables interacts in the simulated environment. The purposes of simulations may vary to include education, research, design improvement and/or the exploration of the probable effect of different policy decisions.

Guyonne Kalbe(2004) identifies and distinguishes two types of simulation models: macro and micro levels. According to Kalbe, the macro-level is applied mostly for huge sectors of the industries. This macro simulation is usually applied by developed countries in order to assess and understand policy changes. On the other hand, the micro-level is used for a specific company using a sample of population when a need for more precised and focused information is its goal. In contrast to large-scale industries that use the macro-level approach, the micro-level is individualized.

Since problems in policy decisions are not linear by nature, computer simulations provides a concrete view of the situation and how the variables changes pace. These changes in behaviors are integral in developing policies. Steven Bankes(1992) explicates the use of computer simulation in policy decisions wherein models used in policy analysis provide arguments to illuminate options for policy decisions based on the result of computer simulated analysis.

The methodology has been successfully used in development projects. Thorngate & Tavakoli(2009) mention fields where computer simulations has aided decision makers in assessing the context and solutions to specific problems. Among these include: the climate changes, effects of fiscal changes in economic policies, traffic regulations, health allocation resources, air regulations and crisis management to name a few.

It is noted that simulations and modelling could be based on artificial data generating process (DGP) or real live data from the environment for analysis. The real data derived from the environment is often called "big data" due to the significantly larger size. This is especially critical in the development communication discussion when there is prevalent use of digital communication technology in low and middle income countries (Taylor & Schroeder, 2015). The technologies in these countries include mobile phones and notebooks. These technologies emit data as a byproduct and have great potential to fill some of the problematic gaps encountered by country policy makers and international development organizations. There is research indicating that the use of big data represents an important complement to country level statistics (Taylor & Schroeder, 2015)., better water quality modelling (Korfmacher, 1998) and improved agricultural development (WESTERVELT, 2001).

The use of big data can ensure a more accurate measurement of macro-economic data such as price track. The Billion Prices Project (BPP) initiated by MIT's Sloan School of Management challenges the Argentina government on the misleading inflation index report. It reported by very high inflation rate by the government's statistical institute which led to the fire of all government officials in the department a few years later. The actual inflation rate after the lay-off eventually stabilizes. The group in MIT decided to investigate what is going on by programming a web scraper to find prices for everyday goods posted on the web by the country's supermarkets. It scrapes many data on the web and is a financially affordable experiment. The outcome of the result led to an increased suspicion that Argentina's statistical agency was under pressure to level off inflation rate by higher order authority. The BPP proves to be influential because it produced an inflation index that was more intuitively reflective of perceptions and in real society than the government. It also provides an alternative set of perspective on economic trends which policymakers can use to make prudent finance policy decisions. There is an increasing need for major governments in the world to rethink how development statistics should be collated in order to craft better and finer public policy.

The simulation approach in policy science is beneficial to policy coherence on the sustainable development goals commonly called SDGs. The SGDs developed by United Nations has integrative nature which is suitable for integrative modelling techniques (Collste et al., 2017). Collste and the researchers have shown in a Tanzania experiment that modelling approach towards SGDs can bring interlinks to the forefront and facilitate a shift to a discussion on development grounded in systems thinking. It brings the multitudes of possible feedback loops that shape a country's development especially those in developing country. The modelling approach in SDGs maps interlinkages and provide analysis about the resulting behaviour of different policy decisions. It also provide new casual pathways on investments in public projects.

Applications of policy sciences to context-specific developmental policy issues

Environmental assessment 
The policy sciences are highly relevant in environmental impact assessments (EIA) and large-scale environmental change modeling. One example is the use of scenario-making in the study by Garb, Pulver, and VanDeveer (2008). Using storyline driven modeling, they sought to understand the impacts of human activities on natural systems. The said study departs from the increasingly technical approach to scenario analysis. Instead, they drew concept and methodologies from science and technology studies, sociology, and political science. Policy-making is multi-method, and in this case, multi-disciplinary. In this study's framework, scenario is said to be able to "co-produce knowledge and social order by facilitating collaboration between scientific and technical experts of various types and policy-makers and other non-scientists, as together they 'make sense' of aspects of the natural world and aspects of social interaction (their own and that of societies at large)." The intertwined relationship between development communication and policy sciences is affirmed because the study recommends including more representatives of social science professionals in global environmental scenario teams, and creating fora with their active involvement, as well.

In recent years, international-funding agencies such as the World Bank and the Asian Development Bank has recognised the potential of EIA as an opportunity for dialogue between and among project stakeholders (Flor, 2004).

Flor posits that though the EIA is generally regarded as a regularly and management tool, it should also be regarded as a communication process that seeks to achieve mutual understanding—the overall purpose of development communication and for that matter, environmental communication programs. This mutual understanding would translate to societal environmental consciousness.
Development communication as a discipline grew as a response to some of the most pressing problems of underdevelopment including environment and resources degradation. Environmental communication programs are logically subsumed under development communication.

Citing five case studies of the use of communication and social mobilisation in environmental protection and natural resources management programs, Flor laid out the following lessons learned from the five programs:

 Effective environment communication is not merely instructive nor consultative.
 Effective environmental communication is not merely informative either.
 Participation and collective action is internally driven, not externally imposed.
 Environmental communication should make use of indigenous media.
 Environment communication should be done on an interpersonal level as well as on a community level, and further on a national level.
 Participation takes time; effective communication proceeds at its own pace.
 Effective environment communication assumes a momentum of its own.

Transformational Communication Approach in Chaotic Environment

Development communication policies on environment take on approaches expected to create good environment practices. A particular approach that aims for the conversion of the heart and mind is Transformational Communication. This communication model is the answer to failed environment programs, especially the top-down strategy and those that target only behavior change (Flor and Smith, 1997).

Mooney (2017) views Transformational Communication superior to other communication types which simply passes information (transactional) and purpose (transformative) on a rational level. He defines Transformational as transfer of meanings to achieve emotional connection.  The International Environmental Communication Association explains that meanings and values influence how people relate to nature and environment. It also asserts that sustainable ecology entails changes in human culture. Thus, ethical and effective communication helps usher in necessary cultural adjustments to solve ecological crisis (Meisner, 2015).

For Flor & Smith (1997), this value-laden or normative approach of Transformational Communication paradigm makes it more effective than other modes in addressing the highly unstable or chaotic biogeopysical components of the environment system. The Butterfly Effect for example shows that just a little stimuli (flapping of a butterfly wings) can suddenly make a fine weather turbulent. 
In the area of communication, this chaotic field is populated with numerous friendly and unfriendly behaviors toward the environment.  Interventions for each behavior may not be feasible, and solutions for only a few might also be fragmented.  Flor & Smith(1997) advise that focusing on norms that direct environment-friendly behaviors is the key intervention in complex ecology.

Flor & Smith (1997) offers three substantive areas of the normative approach: Environmental Literacy, Environmental Ethics, and Environmental Advocacy geared for massive social transformation. According to Flor & Smith (1997), these three areas in Transformational Communication operate as institutional or network level, process-driven social learning which initiates values formation, and strategic by working with specific leaders and policy makers key to the mobilization of the critical mass in environment revolution.

Establishing Trust in Internal Communication

According to Kennan and Hazleton (2006) in their theory of internal public relations, they said that effective communication is based on social capital. Social capital is the ability of the organization to achieve desirable organizational goals, which could be through employee satisfaction, commitment, productivity and customer satisfaction. Shockley-Zalabak et al. (2000) argued that trust is a social capital. Sockley-Zalabak's found that trust is linked to lower incidents of litigation and legislation. It also directly affects an organization's ability to deal with change and crisis. They also found that trust influences job satisfaction, productivity and team building.

Corporate communication policies are essential in sustaining an organization. It can make or break your business and thus have to be explicitly communicated especially when dealing with complex issues and rapid changes in a turbulent market.

Source: Employee/Organizational Communications by Bruce Berger (2008). Employee / Organizational Communications

Policy science as catalyst instrument for environmental communication towards development

Policy science is the bedrock in developing environmental and social movement to address immense issue and predicament regarding environmental depletion and societal development. However, there are three components to be considered when addressing about the issue and talking about development (economy, environment, and society). The most prevalent phenomenon bound to become increasingly imperative through the ongoing dual process of economic-cum-ecological globalization wherein the process of constructing policies for sustainable development is essential. The concept of "policy science" plays a central role in the development; therefore, the incorporation and synchronization of communication and policy science in tackling the challenges encountered is valuable. The communicators are critical contributors to societal development and environmental sustainability wherein the basis could be aided as the framework for policy analysis and policy construction. At these science-policy interfaces, policymakers, communicators and other key stakeholders are supposed to interact on a constant basis.

Development with emphasis on environmental communication instrument guided by the policy science is a trending topic. Indeed, the consideration of environmental communication in developing policy to handle the enduring distresses act as catalyst for policy makers to unravel protuberant concern. Numerous countries that have developed or are developing when surfacing about the environment is essentially crucial as the development that is being misguided by the policy science will lead to a plethora of environmental crisis. Therefore, policy creation in fostering environmental communication is vital as it has significantly contributed to the totality growth of economy and serve as a platform to raise key questions that positively helpful in decision making. Environmental communication, defined as "... the medium that we use in constructing environmental problems and negotiating communities different responses to them. The development of environmental policy instruments at the national level has a positive influence on environmental management at other levels and all sectors. However, the requirement in developing "environmental communication instrument" is essential to lay the foundation for the framework to understand the environmental communication policy science in stimulating for development into top-down stream from national level. Communication in the environmental sector that is primarily formally regulated by access to information and participation legal acts, has great potential, if an immense variety of well-developed and continuously emerging new environmental communication forms represented by different sectors and target groups, are utilized for the common goal of sustainable development. However, these will become successful when communicators, policy makers, and key stakeholders can effectively convey their messages to each other and build mutual trust based on a set of co-constructed knowledge. Setting policy to promote environmental communication for development is essential. However, understanding environmental communication instruments especially the broad spectrum of technical content and social consideration to lever the consequences should not be deserted.

Governance 
In a study by Hilbert, Miles, and Othmer (2009), a five-round Delphi exercise was conducted to show how "international foresight exercises, through online and offline tools, can make policy-making in developing countries more participatory, fostering transparency and accountability of public decision-making". Policy science was used to identify future priorities with regard to the 2005–2007 Latin American and Caribbean Action Plan for the Information Society (eLAC2007). The paper presented specific policy guidance, and explained how Policy [null Delphi] methods can be applied to make public decision-making more transparent and accountable, particularly in developing countries. Practical implications drawn include 1) "the governments' acknowledgement of the value of collective intelligence from civil society, academic and private sector participants of the Delphi and the ensuing appreciation of participative policy-making" and 2) "the role that can be played by the United Nations (and potentially by other inter-governmental agencies) in international participatory policy-making in the digital age, especially if they modernize the way they assist member countries in developing public policy agendas".

Issues and Challenges of Development Communication and Policy Science

Although the field of development communication has been present as early as the 1950s, Waisbord (2005) mentioned that it faces two sets of challenges. The first set of challenges has something to do with the critical aspects of development projects: scale and sustainability. The first challenge asks how a small-scale project and its effects in a locally based community be replicated to the national level. On the other hand, sustainability refers to community projects that have a long-lasting impact. It asks the questions about how long will the impact of the project take effect?. The second set of challenges focuses on the specific issues of communication. This concentrates on bridging the divide between 'small' and 'big' media and looking at their contribution towards development communication.

Servaes and Lie (2014) also outlined the main challenges for the field of communication for development:
The differences between good governance and good government and the issues of transparency and accountability. 
The complexity of the participatory concept. 
Participation taking place at different levels.
The reinforcement of independent and pluralistic media.
Not making full use of potential radio.
Enabling policy and resources.
Implementing a legal and supportive framework favoring the right to free expression and the emergence of free and pluralistic information systems.
Building alliances
New global partnerships are necessary with the media, development agencies, universities, and governments.

Distance education 
In the book "Beyond Access and Equity: Distance Learning Models in Asia", Flor (2002) details the case of SMP Terbuka, a junior secondary education in Indonesia delivered in distance learning mode. This is in consonance with the country's pursuit of the Universalization of Basic Education. In assessing the socio-cultural environment of SMP Terbuka and in determining the policy environment for distance learning, environmental scanning was done. The study also used the problematique method to analyze structural-organizational problems in a distance learning system, along with their causes. Overall, a systems analysis approach was employed where the environment, the stakeholders, the organization cum network, and problem structure were analyzed. Flor proceeds with a proposed communication and advocacy plan for SMP Terbuka aimed at eliciting public support to this alternative education mode. In designing the social marketing and advocacy blueprint, situation analysis was used. This employed four methods, namely, "environmental scanning, communication resources assessment; review of existing communication strategies; and strategic impact analysis directed at sector stakeholders".

Health reforms 
Walt and Gilson (1994) emphasized the central role of policy analysis in health reforms in developing countries. In their study, they argue that health policy narrowly focuses on the content of reform, and neglects other crucial considerations such as the context that calls for such reform, the processes involved, and the social actors or the stakeholders associated with the reform.
Bernardo (2017) has considered that care policies are not the same globally. It has been recommended to create four complementary offices to standardize what is right or wrong to all patients as well as contribute to establishing the key strategies and priorities of the national policy. This includes the managerial office in evidence-based medicine, evidence-generation offices, evidence-implementation offices, and conflict-arbitration offices.

Community Health

The underlying principles of development communication have had significant impact on various levels of policy planning. A UNICEF commissioned report by Galway, for example, cited that there was a large communication initiative in Bangladesh where a national information campaign was launched to raise awareness of villagers on arsenic in drinking water. In his report, "top-down health education models are being replaced with more participatory approaches;" an approach which development communication features as a more effective methodology than linear models of communication. Schiavo also noted that participatory processes provide a platform for health messages and interventions which communicate directly to local communities.

Information overload and the wastage ratio 
Fred Fedler (1989), mentioned in the book, Dilemmas in the Study of Information: Exploring the Boundaries of Information Science, describes the impact of the Information age by referring to media's "vulnerability to hoaxes".  Fedler contends "journalists are vulnerable to information and will always be. Journalists cannot determine the truth to the stories they publish, nor check every details. They receive too many stories, and a single story may contain hundreds of details".  In the same vein, this is what majority of the specialists posits as the information explosion.

Now more than ever, information has exceeded in millions of gigabytes. Technology has brought people around the world to be confronted with so much information that utilization of this information has now become an issue.  Dr Paul Marsden of the Digital Intelligence Today defines information overload as "when the volume of potentially useful and relevant information available exceeds processing capacity and becomes a hindrance rather than a help" (Marsden, 2013).

Dr. Alexander Flor, in his article on the information wastage ratio, argues that although information can be consumed anytime and seldom has expiration date;

"Research information is generated for a particular purpose, a specific user and a definite problem in mind. If such information is unavailable to the right person, at the right time and at the right place, then we conclude that the effort exerted to generate this amount of information has been wasted".

One approach that Flor has postulated to establish the underutilization is his information wastage ratio. The ratio takes into consideration the concepts of information generation (IG) and information utilization (IU) expressed as "wastage ratio that is equivalent to one minus the amount of information utilized divided by the quantity of information generated", thus:

Wr = 1 – IU/IG

Flor's formula accounts for the information deficit especially, among the Third World countries, where information utilization is constrained by factors such as  "low literacy, limited media access and availability, low computer literacy, low levels of education and unsound communication policy".
The framework that Flor presented is best described as "the communication revolution contributes to the quantity of information generated thus, information explosion happens". Since the relationship of the two phenomena is reciprocal, "the quantity of information, the quality of information and the information overload determine the information wastage in an information society".
The outcome of this wastage ratio provides support for the initiation of communication policies to ensure full utilization of information in varied fields.

Between research, development and policy

It is a complex task to achieve effectiveness in development policy especially in rural areas. It involves a range of stakeholders who need to demonstrate coordinated action. Sunitiyoso et al. (2012) claim that holistic thinking is needed to solve public policy problems which requires collaborative efforts across different organizational boundaries. The government through its administration must show vigor and integrity to implement these programs. Development policy makers must consider providing education and sustained training in order to materialize the programs provided to the beneficiaries. Sustained training does not only rely to ICT, it also needs emotional quotient to motivate beneficiaries to get involved and develop a sense of ownership.  President Julius K. Nyerere once stated that the people must participate in considering, planning, and implementing their development (in Tanganyika African National Union, 1971 ). Therefore, development can only be achieved when people develop themselves. This has been realized by not only socialist and communist nations, but also by capitalist nations such as Singapore and South Korea. Self- development is usually accompanied by social mobilization by political parties, non- government organizations and workers from the academe.

Scholars have proposed categories for the analysis of changes present in the research and policy sectors. What generates lack of accord between the effectiveness of development communication policy is the unrealized link between the importance of research and development to policy making. As compared to Europe, the United States and Latin America, the challenges of knowledge and technology transfer have been solved in the forefront of attention in economic, social and industrial policy.

Gap between researchers and policy makers
The praxis or the marriage of research and practice, according to Flor (1991) is needed to address the pressing social issues that are pestering the society. However, there are factors that delay its realization. According to UNCTAD Virtual Institute (2006), there are still a huge communication gap between researchers and policy makers. On the side of the policy makers, the information on ongoing researchers barely reaches to them. The researchers, on the other hand, lack the awareness and the knowledge on the most important policy that could contribute so much in the research. Here are some common reasons for the wide gap between the two:
Policy makers turn primarily to international organizations, international research institutes or their own technical experts or diplomatic missions to obtain information and analysis as policy inputs. Local universities and research institutes may have the capacity but are often not able to engage in cooperation with policy makers.
Policy-makers consider the credibility of researchers and research outputs a key requirement for cooperation.
Governments lack systematic procedures regarding which research institutions to turn to, and when and how to establish contact with researchers.
Data required for informed research may be non-existent or inaccessible.
Hence, the joint UNCTAD-WTO-ITC workshop on trade policy analysis workshop has forwarded these recommendations for both the research institutions and policy making bodies:

As a researcher:
Try to disseminate information about current research projects as widely as possible:
Invite concerned government officials to conferences or presentations of research, or organize specific events bringing together policy makers and researchers
Send notes and abstracts to relevant ministries
Distribute research to government agencies but also to NGOs, which might also be among its users. Be ready to discuss work in progress with policy-makers after initial contacts have been established.
Try to get in direct contact, for example with negotiators, by providing them with short notes/abstracts of relevant research findings.
Establish contact and build a long-term cooperation with relevant ministries. The start can be facilitated by having a "champion" in the ministry. However, the researcher/research institution may need to avoid being too closely identified with a "champion", and hence, depending too much on the evolution of the "champion's" status.
Access to high-ranked officials at ministries can be facilitated by involving higher-level representatives at universities (deans, vice-chancellors...) in the establishment and maintenance of contacts. However, more decentralized cooperation can also be productive if he procedures within the university tend to be very hierarchical and bureaucratic.
As a policy maker:
Involve policy-makers in research. Policy-makers who are consulted at the initial stages of a research project tend to be more open since they can actively participate and hence have a stake in shaping the research questions, and thereby take "ownership" of the research as well. Regular interaction during the research project can help adjusting the questions researched and the tools used to the needs of policy makers.
Make sure that your research addresses issues of policy relevance to your country by approaching permanent missions in Geneva which can act as facilitators by providing information regarding current policy-relevant research questions.

Bridging the gap through collaboration

There has been shift of policy-making from academic sources of development relations between government, academia and industry, and scholars often refer this as "triple helix model". Henry Etzkowitz defines it as "a spiral model of innovation that captures multiple reciprocal relationships at different points in the process of knowledge capitalization." Etzkowitz and Melo (2004) stated that recognizing that university is the source of new knowledge, industry is where the practice ground for technology and development and the supporting role of government as policy makers. The importance of collaboration is a successful model in any project management. More so when a holistic approach is applied in policy development, it may be a solution to address the complexity of policy implementation as all stakeholders are required to participate beginning from the conceptualization, planning, policy formulation and implementation.

Policy sciences 
Nora Quebral (1971) defines development communication as "the art and science of human communication applied to the speedy transformation of a country and the mass of its people from poverty to a dynamic state of economic growth that makes possible greater social equality and larger fulfilment of the human potential".

The fundamental characteristic that distinguishes development communication from traditional views of mass communication is its purposive nature. According to Flor, policies, being guidelines, imply that certain directions are already assumed. Development communication and the policies sciences stem from the same rationale, which is the need for actively applying knowledge form and principles of the social sciences in order to solve large-scale societal problems under the premise of social change.

Melafopulos (2008) presented two modes or approaches to development communication: the monologic mode and the dialogic mode. The monologic mode is linked to the standpoint of 'diffusion' following the one-way model of communication. The purpose of this mode is to disseminate information and messages to persuade its recipients about the intended change. In short, communication is positioned to (1) inform and (2) persuade. In this model, the feedback is enhanced and canned allowing the sender to refine its persuasive message. On the other hand, dialogic mode is related with the participatory paradigm which follows a two-way communication model. It seeks to create a conducive environment where stakeholders are involved in all stages of the project from the definitions down to the implementation of solutions. This model seeks to make use of communication (1) to assess and (2) to empower. The use of dialogic communication paves the way for building of trust and understanding which is the key to participation and eventually for the empowerment of the people in the grassroots.

Achieving development in the community is collaboration between different stakeholders. Development communication believes that in order to have genuine development, that desire to improve and uplift their lives must come from the grassroots level; it must come from the people. Development communication empowers the people to believe in themselves that they can do something in order to alleviate their standard of living. In their book, Introduction to Development Communication, Ongkiko and Flor (2006) claimed that Development communication entails motivating individuals and groups of people such as farmers, fisherfolks, workers, housewives, and the youth to change their habits, their lifestyles, their way of thinking and their way of doing things. This further proves that development communication is not just merely providing facts and information instead its goal is to persuade the people to become an active participant in the achievement of their goals.

Policy sciences refer to the scientific study of policies and policy making. Policy refers to a cluster of decisions with a particular purpose and audience in mind. The word "science" is used to suggest the use of empirical data gathered from systematic observation. The plural form (sciences) is used to underscore the interdisciplinary nature of this field (Allen, 1978). Policy science was conceived in order to cope-up with the fast changing landscape of our society. Because of these changes they called, "turbulent field", the traditional social science methodology was already considered inadequate in solving today's societal problems (Allen, 1978). The goal of policy sciences is to develop and provide concrete solution to the rising problems brought by technological progress.

Policy sciences are concerned with knowledge of and in the decision processes of the public and civic order. Knowledge of the decision process implies systematic, empirical studies of how policies are made and put into effect. When knowledge is systematic, it goes beyond the aphoristic remarks that are strewn through the "wisdom" literature of the past.

Development communication and policy sciences are two essential elements in resolving recurring dilemma especially in the third world societies.

In the Information Age 
In Flor's Developing Societies in the Information Age: A Critical Perspective, he mentioned the 2000 Okinawa Summit of G7/G8 nations that described information and communications technology or ICT as "one of the most potent forces in shaping the Twenty-first Century...fast becoming a vital engine of growth for the world economy". The summit also decried the existence of a digital divide between rich and poor nations and that the major challenge posed today is to bridge this widening chasm. The Information Age, the so-called third era of human civilization is a pervasive social phenomenon, a global environment. In the Information Age, capital becomes less important than information. In fact, information becomes the "primary resource". There is an observed global shift in resources of power from land, labor and capital to information. The change is more on the nature of resources that are being controlled.

As Flor stated, "informatization comes with the Information Age. All aspects of society – politics, culture, business and economy – have become increasingly information-oriented. Information gives rise to economies and societies wherein information, naturally, becomes the dominant commodity or resource. Concomitant to informatization is the globalization of the economy. The communications or information revolution has tended to shrink the size of the world, figuratively. Instant communication between two persons situated at opposite sides of the globe is a common occurrence. Distance no longer serves as a minor factor in communication."

Information society vs. Information Age 
An information society should be differentiated from Information Age. An information society refers to a social system, meanwhile, the Information Age refers to an era in human civilization, a worldwide phenomenon. It is possible for people to live in an information age but not in an information society. Observations have also pointed that the trend towards information societies can be found in the Third World. For example, in Asia, certain trends that are indifferent to political developments show that Asia is moving towards that direction. These trends include: the growing demand for mobile devices and software, broadband, Wi-Fi, wi-max services, and even online educational programs.

Control through communication 
"Control is achieved through communication. Norbert Wiener, the father of cybernetics, equated communication with control and observed that it is negatively related to entropy, the tendency for all systems towards breakdown. This function or relationship is magnified in the Information Age." Therefore, in the Information Age, there seems to be a positive correlation between information and power, between communication and power. The logical consequence of this is the gravitation of special interest groups to the communication/information industry and the mad scramble for communication resources. Those who will gain access to more resources would understandably hold more political and economic power. They may, in turn, perpetuate this condition by determining enabling societal structures. According to Flor, information, traditionally defined, is that which contributes to the reduction of uncertainty. Although technically accurate, the definition neglects the social dimension of information. "It is the social function which adds value to information and which gives those who possess it advantage over those who do not. Thus, information should be regarded first and foremost as a resource. As in the case of other resources, there is a tendency for other exploitative groups to hoard information and to use it to further their interests. Information nowadays is associated with influence and power. It is now treated as a dominant commodity under the control and manipulation of the elite." He also noted that "Information resources should contribute more towards equality than exploitation, towards harmony than conflict, towards complementarities than dominance, towards integration than segregation, towards participation than elitism, towards indigenous development than dependency, and towards convergence than divergence."

The availability of information may be a function of the availability of mass media, new media and other channels of information. Availability of communication media is obviously a prerequisite for access. For communities wherein media are relatively unavailable, access to communication media is hampered to a considerable degree.

In contrast, development communication can also be key towards more democratic societies. Democracy has been a prevailing philosophy in many countries for the recent years. However, until today, how democratic institutions affect human well-being, particularly people's health is still argued. Existing evidences are not robust or strong in providing critical insights into the significance of democratic institutions on achieving better life expectancies and reducing mortalities (Besley and Kudamatsu, 2006). Life expectancies have increased dramatically and mortalities have significant reduced over the years. Such progress has been mostly attributed to increasing income per capita (Li and Zhu, 2006), improved medical technologies and interventions (Papageorgiou et al., 2007) and strengthened global collaborations (Elobu et al., 2014, Chu et al., 2014), among others. Previous literature has also favoured more democratic governments in maximizing health systems performance; and thereafter, improving health outcomes. In this view, health outcomes are better achieved because governments are controlled by the majority, leaders are more accountable for the benefit of all rather than minor groups of society, and mechanisms for selecting competent leaders to implement policies are deemed stronger. Despite evidence on its significance, some have still argued that democracy can only be successful in effecting positive impacts only if proper conditions are met. For example, the 1983 Polish health system has moved from a communist model without general practitioners to where clinicians in polyclinics provided free healthcare. The former system was then perceived to be better because the latter created more opportunities for bribery; hence, increasing inequitable access to healthcare (Scully, 2007). Recently, most health systems have transitioned along a continuum of private or market health systems similar to the United States and a public or state health systems similar to the United Kingdom (Chernichovsky, 1995). Such transitions may also be highly attributable to transitions in political states.  In a market/private-based health system similar to the United States health system, medical care is provided by private physicians and by private and public hospitals and patients have free choice of physicians. In addition, most people receive health insurance coverage through their workplace and health insurance is provided by multiple third-party insurers (Chernichovsky, 1995). On the other hand, planned/public-based health systems such as in the United Kingdom expects that healthcare is a right (Chernichovsky, 1995). As such, health demands are provided directly through budgeting and management of providers.  Low and middle income countries (LMICs) are placed in between these continuum. In most LMICs, various health system reforms and transitions have already been done. Despite such transitions, they are still faced with poorer health outcomes and health statuses that are far beyond health targets. Hence, is it really democracy that matters or does it simply serve as proxy for societal and political progress? Some argued that proper conditions must first be met for such gains of democracy to be achieved. Development communication can serve as a tool to ensure the country's visions are aligned, a step towards creating such proper conditions.

Information and communication technologies for development 
In the Information Age, technological growth is a crucial driving force behind economic progress, citizen engagement and job creation. Information and communication technologies (ICTs) are shaping many aspects of the world's economies, governments and societies. Developing countries, too, recognize the importance of engaging various stakeholders to harness the transformative power of ICTs to provide more efficient services, catalyze economic development and strengthen social networks. When done properly and implemented effectively, ICT infrastructure investment and policy reform can empower poverty reduction and shared prosperity.

The World Bank Group's Information and Communication Technology (ICT) sector strategy, which was adopted in 2012, intends to help developing countries make use of the potential of ICTs to improve the delivery of public services; drive innovations and productivity gains; and improve competitiveness. Under the strategy, the World Bank, the International Finance Corporation (IFC) and the Multilateral Investment Guarantee Agency (MIGA) focus on three priorities: (1) Transformation, by making developments more open and accountable and improving service delivery; (2) Connectivity, by scaling up affordable access to broadband including for women, disabled citizens, disadvantaged communities and people living in remote and rural areas; and (3) Innovation, by developing competitive IT-based industries and fostering ICT innovation with a focus on job creation.

Nascent technologies, such as virtual reality and artificial intelligence, are also set to reshape the development landscape. The United Nations, through its Virtual Reality Series Project, has tapped virtual reality to build platforms for advocacy, awareness, and fundraising. Its VR production titled Clouds over Sidra earned accolades for shedding light on the conditions of some 84,000 Syrian refugees in Jordan's Za'atari camp. HTC, developer of the Vive VR system, also supports the UN Sustainable Development Goals through its "VR for Impact" program, which seeks to "create a pathway to global peace and prosperity together". In terms of policy implication, the immersive experience brought about by VR is expected "to elevate the voices of those who often do not have a say, bringing peoples' voices directly into the decision making process".

Digital divide 
The rapid transformation of technology has revolutionized the way we communicate. As a result, more and more people are getting "wired", which means connected to the Internet. The explosion of information creates an interconnected global village where everyone can easily connect and transact business in a flick of a second. This explosion of information however has widen the gap between the information rich and the information poor creating Digital Divide. Groups or communities that can afford technologies and has full access to the internet are the information rich while the underprivileged are the information poor.

In his book Developing Societies in the Information Age,Alexander Flor elucidated that digital divide emerges from an information dependent social environment. He further emphasized that "the divide is further aggravated by domineering system between the haves and the have-nots". In a study conducted by Dr. Alexander Flor from 1983 to 1986 on the widening gap and its implications on the agricultural sector, he found out that "the information rich gets richer while the information poor gets poorer."

Gender equality

Although the discourse of development communication may recognize the importance of considering gender in the process of social change, organizational structures and norms may inhibit the successful implementation of projects. Despite the considerable attention directed toward women in health, nutrition, and population projects, women's conditions have not improved. This failure should not, however, be attributed as a direct consequence of development communication. Rather, the problematic conditions of women, along with the interventions designed to resolve them, need to be situated within a broader context of discourse and practice that privileges individual consumption and structural privatization in strategies for social change (Watkins, 1999, 63).

Hooda and Singh (2012) note that many feminist scholars recognize that everyday women's participation in the process of communication is essential. Involvement by the women to state their opinions in the institutions and systems that govern their lives is not only for recognition that participation is a basic human right, but also for a redistribution of political power in favor of disadvantaged groups. Involvement in decision-making is primarily about confronting the hegemonic structures of power—locally, nationally and globally (Sheth, 1997). It is a political action, a political struggle, a struggle that is not only among states, but also among people. Indeed, Wong (2012) shows why a discourse on gender matters in ICT for Development. Wong (2012) cites Resurreccion (2011) who stresses that the access to, and the use of, ICTs is gender-shaped in that gender influences how the benefits, costs and risks of ICTs are distributed between, and within, women and men. As noted by Kothari (1985), communications is not taken as informatics (alone), but as politics on issues of empowerment.

Information and communication, food security and nutrition, and gender equality are closely linked dimensions of rural development, according to the Food and Agriculture Organization (FAO)-Dimity Project, 2011. The vital contribution of women to the agricultural sphere in developing societies cannot be overemphasized. It's critical to give rural women access to the same resources and opportunities as men in order to be more productive. To achieve enhanced productivity and better performance, women have to be provided access to information, knowledge and decision-making. Hooda and Singh (2011) however opine that with regard to the impact of technologies on women, there has been a tendency on the part of governments and development agencies to treat technologies as neutral, value-free, without taking into account the social, environmental and economic effects of the technology being introduced. A common assumption with respect to technology is that the simple existence of technology itself will advance competence and will thus fetch empowerment and reimbursement to the women. Wong (2012) illustrates that restricted access to assets, gender-biased institutional arrangements, and unfavourable social structures have reduced women's capability to draw on ICTs in tackling climate change.  According to Hooda and Singh (2011), focus on ICT competence and capability compromises concerns related to equity. In any case, social equity requires assurance to women's equal opportunity. Therefore, women's equality needs to be integrated as a cornerstone of any development and communication strategy. In addressing these limitations, Wong (2012) outlines four digital empowerment proposals that may make 'ICT climate change' interventions more gender-sensitive:

(1) Contextualise gender mainstreaming: gender mainstreaming helps integrate gender analysis into ICT policies. It acknowledges that men and women perceive and receive information differently, and that this requires diverse approaches to adaptation. However, the attempt to reposition women and girls as 'ecocarers' is problematic because this fails to capture their protective, as well as their destructive, role in relation to natural resources. Without addressing the unequal power relations between women

and girls, e-adaptive practices can also help reproduce the intergenerational equalities.

(2) Strengthen governance: crafting new and reforming old, institutional arrangements is essential to improve gender inclusion. Women only interventions are sometimes necessary to empower previously excluded women to engage in ICT related decisions. However, poor and powerless men should also have their say in climate change policies.

(3) Develop gender-sensitive funding mechanisms: securing adequate funding to support ICT interventions is crucial to gender empowerment. Yet, targeting women by microcredit projects risk putting an additional financial burden on them, and that needs serious reconsideration.

(4) Recognise agency-structure dynamics: women are active agents, but they are socially constrained from engaging in ICT related decisions. Women's preferences, institutional arrangements and politics need to be taken into account in order to tackle digital exclusion.

Wong (2012) believes that taking the outlined four proposals are useful for development agencies, governments and NGOs to improve the gendered outcomes from use of ICTs in response to an issue as climate change. Thus, communicating from a gender perspective is important for fighting poverty and for supporting the economic empowerment of women. Women who are frequently the most disadvantaged gender in society are central to development, yet they have very little voice in the process of development planning. The United States Agency for International Development (USAID), Gender Equality and Women's Empowerment reports that "while women make up more than 40 percent of the agriculture labor force, only 3 to 20 percent are landholders. In Africa, women-owned enterprises make up as little as 10 percent of all businesses. In South Asia, that number is only 3 percent. And despite representing half the global population, women comprise less than 20 percent of the world's legislators."

Advancing gender equality and women's empowerment is a vital key in utilizing human resources and capital on an enormous scale. According to the World Bank, "countries with greater gender equality are more prosperous and competitive". For communities to grow, gender equality policy and strategies have to be developed and implemented. Women must be provided access to information, technology, and education. They must have equal rights and equal opportunities as entrepreneurs, wage earners, and leaders of our society. Promoting gender equality is a profitable investment we can make to advance women development.

Since its early inception, development communication has been widely utilized by many regions of the world owing its strategic direction of alleviating the lives of the poor by extending knowledge and information to a number of projects and programs intended to create a sustainable life. Hence, development communication practice in various areas of the world yielded a number of policy integrations reflecting its core objectives for an inclusive development. True to its definition, development communication, according to S.T. Kwame Boafo, author of the article 'Utilizing Development Communication Strategies in African Societies: A Critical Perspective', "is the application of modem and traditional communication technologies to aid and enhance the process of socio-economic, political and cultural change. It is the planned, conscious and systematized use of communication strategies and processes to bridge informational and attitudinal gaps and to establish or sustain a climate that favors the process of change and development." However, this definition itself does not lend the idea that change immediately follows. Hence, Boafo articulated further that the definition above "does not imply that communication or information per se can effect development or change without an integrated and consistently pursued national development policy." Therefore, it is vital that development communication should be an integral element in the formulation of national policies so as to utilize its full potential.

Catholic Church: sample communications policies 
Christ commissioned the Apostles to preach the Good News to the whole world, a mission extended to all Christians today. Communication therefore is part of following Christ. Being committed to spread the Good News, the Catholic Church has always been at the forefront of communications – from oral preaching, catechesis, personal friendships, small or big groups gatherings (openly or in secret where Christians are persecuted, even in present times), manual copying in papyrus or parchments scrolls, artwork, architecture, oral traditions, printing, theaters, tri-media and online, etc.

For academic studies within the Catholic setting, Pontifical Universities in Rome offer Bachelor's, Licentiate and Doctoral courses on Church communications, lasting three to six years.

The following guidelines, and communication as a whole, should, as Prof. Flor states, "be employed for the service of others" (Chapter 3, p. 7).

Catholic Church Communications at the universal Church level: The Pope's Roman Curia

The Roman Curia, or the Pope's central administrative office, has a Secretariat for Communication, which coordinates all the media realities in the Vatican:
Pontifical Council for Social Communications
Holy See Press Office
Vatican Internet Service
Vatican Radio
Vatican Television Centre
L'Osservatore Romano
Vatican Printing Press
Photo Service
Vatican Publishing House

This setup is replicated in various degrees in countries all over the world. Communications policies are left to the regional, national or parish levels, rather than having a unified policy for the Catholic Church in the whole world.

Many documents, in the form of reflections or guidelines, have been published on different topics related with communications. In this website, one document dates back to 1936, an Encyclical Letter of Pope Pius XI, called "Vigilanti Cura", manifesting his thoughts on the "Motion Picture" as it affects the moral and religious life of Christians.

Example of Catholic Church Communications Policies at the Regional Level: CELAM

The Consejo Episcopal LatinoAmericano (CELAM), is the umbrella organization of 22 Episcopal Conferences (groups of Latin American and Caribbean Catholic Bishops, usually by country). Its office is based in Bogotá, Colombia, and has a Department of Communications and Press.

While no Communications Policy is posted on CELAM's website (nor is any retrievable online), there is a link to a presentation of the Department's four programs. Specific objectives contained therein could be considered as general directives indicating what the different lower levels of Church organization should undertake (my own translation from Spanish follows):
Common Communication Efforts in Communion and Dialogue towards Fraternity
Formation and Expression in Communication for the Development of the Culture of Encounter and the Announcing the Good News
Communication for the Transformation of Reality Towards the Fullness of Life of our Peoples
Inter-institutional Communion and Dialogue (within the Church)

CELAM is situated at a very broad level, covering part of North America (Mexico), the whole of Central and South America, and the Caribbeans. It is quite typical for Church documents at a high level, to focus heavily on principles, objectives and generalized directives; meanwhile, the concrete communications policies would be left to the local levels.

Example of Catholic Church Communications Policies at the National Level: USCCB Social Media Guidelines

The United States Conference of Catholic Bishops (USCCB) "is an assembly of the hierarchy of the United States and the U.S. Virgin Islands who jointly exercise certain pastoral functions on behalf of the Christian faithful of the United States. As its Introduction states, "These guidelines are offered as a synthesis of best practices. They include material compiled from church entities, for-profit corporations, and non-profit organizations", presented as an aide to come up with local or organizational communications policies when it comes to the social media.
It begins with guiding principles, quoting from Pope Francis: "Communication is a means of expressing the missionary vocation of the entire Church; today the social networks are one way to experience this call to discover the beauty of faith, the beauty of encountering Christ. In the area of communications too, we need a Church capable of bringing warmth and of stirring hearts".

Social media is a powerful instrument, changing the way people communicate. Pope Benedict XVI says that the Church has to be involved in social media to advance its mission of spreading the Good News, at the same time encouraging respect and dialogue, true friendship. In addition, the Church encourages a responsible use of these social media, in the midst of opportunities and challenges when it comes to visibility, the community and accountability.

The USCCB document tries to cover all the areas in social media, suggesting the following elements to be included when parishes or other Church organizations develop guidelines: define boundaries, include examples of codes of conduct, define instructions, recommendations on dealing with offenders, providing trusted sites, and reminding administrators of their broad audience. Guidelines are also provided for organizational and personal sites, and social networking with minors.

Example of Catholic Church Communications Policies at the Local Level: St. Mary Magdalene Catholic Church, in Simpsonville, South Carolina, USA

These policies pertain to the parish's:

Internal Communication, such as:
Mass Announcements
Welcome/Newcomer Information
Mailings to parishioners
Email communications
Parish bulletin
Parish events for parishioners
Distributed materials

and External Communication, such as:
Marquee on the parish sign
Media interviews
Parish events open to public
Parish website
Press releases
Social media
Community Solicitations

Being a parish that serves the churchgoers, St. Mary Magdalene Catholic Church tries to make clear the procedures that would make the communications processes as efficient as possible. The document is quite detailed, allowing the reader (whether a parish employee, or the public) to know exactly how to proceed in each scenario.

International communication 

International communication, the intellectual field that deals with issues of mass communication at a global level, is sometimes also called development communication. This field includes the history of the telegraph, submarine communication cables, shortwave or international broadcasting, satellite television, and global flows of mass media. Today it includes issues of the Internet in a global perspective and the use of new technologies such as mobile phones.

Risk communication 

Risk communication originated in the United States where environmental clean-up efforts were implemented through legislation. The terms 'risk communications' and 'risk management' were first used by William Ruckelshaus, the first administrator of the U.S. 'Environmental Protection Agency (EPA), which was established in the 1970s. Risk communication includes management decision risks, implementation risks and risks related to existing environmental, health, political, or social circumstances. For instance, in the health sector, risk communication addresses pandemics, natural disasters, bioterrorism, resource contamination, etc. Definitions of "risk" include:
"The identification and analysis, either qualitative or quantitative, of the likelihood of the occurrence of a hazardous event overexposure, and the severity of injury or illness that may be caused by it." —American National Standard for Occupational Health and Safety Management Systems (ANSI/AIHA Z10 – 2005 ):
"...the probability that a substance or situation will produce harm under specified conditions. Risk is a combination of two factors: (1) the probability that an adverse event will occur and (2) the consequences of the adverse event."—The Framework for Environmental Health Risk Management (Presidential/Congressional Commission on Risk Assessment and Risk Management, 1997):
"...the probability (or likelihood) that a harmful consequence will occur as a result of an action."—The Safety Professionals Handbook (Fields 2008 ):

Risk management was described as:
The evaluations and decisions that go into coping with risks (Lundgren and McMakin, 2004)
Planning for a crisis, which should involve the removal of risks and allow an organization, a society, or a system adequate control(Fearn-Banks, 2007) and
Factors that combat crises with the objective of minimizing damage. (Combs, 1999)

Risk communications involves important information for managing risks, both from authorities to those at risk and vice versa.

Development communication benefits from risk communications when the latter clarifies the risks of development (or lack thereof).

Policy analysis in an organizational communication

Development in the community has been observed critically not only the stakeholders but also the public themselves. Being one the recipients of the community projects, the public has been eyeing the government on the implementation of the development projects they are implementing. Part of the analysis in the organization is by analyzing how the communication in an organization works. The two are related as discussed as follows:

Communication and its roles in development
In the Philippines, the Medium Term Development Plan for 2004–2010 of the National Economic Development Authority states, "the successful implementation of the plan rests on the support of all sectors of society—the legislature, the judiciary, the local government units, the media and all sectors of society" (NEDA, 2004).

In the context of Carnoy and Samoff (1990), they believed that education has great importance as part of the means of achieving social transformation. They emphasized that "appropriate ideas, values, and worldviews will be developed so that from the process of scholarship there emerges a new person—not simply with skills, but also someone with an understanding of his or her own role in the world".

More than analyzing how the process of the implementation will run through, it is also relative to note who will deliver the message pertaining to the development project. This is where the role of communication takes place. As mentioned by NEDA, media played an important role in the process of the delivery of development projects. With the wide range of power of media to influence and to transmit information, it has the capability to reach the public connecting to the government and vice versa.

Communication is pervasive in the process of development. Communication includes mass media, telecommunications, information and communication technologies (ICTs), organized interpersonal communication, and all resources used by a society to enable information to flow within it. It has for its aims to inform, educate, persuade, entertain, motivate people and induce behavior change that contributes toward national development.

According to Fraser and Restrepo-Estrada (2001):
"Communication succeeds when it is an integral part, from the very beginning, of a development programme, playing a full role during the identification of the problems and priorities, as well as during the detailed planning, implementation, and evaluation... communication needs clear objectives, identification of different audience groups... careful message design... and monitoring and feedback."

Communication and organizational theory
As mentioned, delivery of development project can be achieved should proper communication will be used. In attaining such, an organization implementing the development project should consider the system to be used.
An organization is where a system is being implemented. Its structure varied depending on the goals of the company, the image it portrays, and the quality it aims to achieve. Being a member of an organization, one has to know how the organization works.

This aim in knowing the technical-know-how within the organization leads to the concept of 'Organization Theory'. Later it becomes a 'social science discipline' which refers to "a body of thinking and writing that describes, explains and influences what goes on in organization". This leads to making this discipline as basis for exploring 'management and leadership theory' that enables the scholars to understand how an 'organization theory' works in the application of a certain system.

Further, organizational theory (OT), according to Barzilai (2016), is the "study of organizations for the benefit of identifying common themes for the purpose of solving problems, maximizing efficiency and productivity, and meeting the needs of stakeholders".

Thus, development communication interweaves with policy science and organizational theory for one reason: Development projects require an organization as deciding body in crafting policy leading to the attainment of the project and as implementor of the projects.

Interface revisited and reinforced: development communication and policy sciences

To affirm the interface, I reviewed the notions of development communication and policy sciences.  Development education, a related and a younger discipline is shortly discussed.  I also highlight the similarities of these fields.

Quebral (2012) redefines development communication as "the science of human communication linked to the transition of communities from poverty in all its forms to a dynamic overall growth that fosters equity and the unfolding of individual potential" (p. 9).

Meanwhile, Guru (2016) explains that development communication "(1) provides a conceptual and practical framework in accelerating development in all spheres of life; (2) includes the integration of planned, organized, and specific communication package into planning, programming, and implementation; (3)facilitates the flow of development education among various stakeholders; and (4) empowers marginalized individuals, groups, and organizations" (p. 101).

I thought that development education is just a function or a subset of development communication just like information, motivation, persuasion, among others.  In fact, it is discipline in its own right that started in the 1990s. Bourn (2015) describes it as "an education approach that (1) responds to issues of development, human rights, justice, and world citizenship; (2) presents an international development and human rights perspective within education in various parts of the world; (3) promotes voices and viewpoints of those who are excluded from an equal share in the benefits of international human development; (4) connects and compares development issues and challenges all over the world; (5) provides opportunities for people to reflect on their international roles and responsibilities with regard to issues of equality and justice in human development; and (6) narrates a new story of human development" (p. 47).

On the other hand, policy sciences or policy studies basically refer to the policy cycle, which involves "policy making, policy implementation, policy evaluation, and policy feedback" (Flynn and Asquer, 2017, p. 40). Originally, it is a function of governance and, therefore the domain of government officials.  However, with democracy as a form of government in many nations, it has also become the domain of the governed, hence, the term public policy.  Most available literature on policy studies quote the definition developed by Hence Thomas Dye as "whatever governments choose to do or not to do."

However, Chakrabarty and Chand (2016) argue that "[t]here cannot be a universal definition of policy although one can endure a near universal definition by highlighting its technical character" (p. 3).  With these, they characterize Dye's definition as "functional in character" and contend that "governments are not at all free to choose because their choice is context-dependent and governed by the ideology they adhere to" (p. 4).

They raise the limitations Dye's definition: (1) does not reflect or represent the ideological goals of the government; (2) does not reflect the critical role of institutions; and (3) does not provide enough inputs to conceptualize public policy as an executive device and as a marker of ideology.

After presenting the etymology of "public" and "policy", they propose a layman's definition through an acronym: POLICY.  PO stands for periodically organized, which suggests that policies are "constantly reinvented and transformed in accordance with changing social, economic, and political realities".  To add, LI means legally induced, which suggests it cannot dispense "constitutions and other legal instruments in shaping policy."  Lastly, CY means calculated yields, which implies that policies must be beneficial and profitable (p. 6).

With this, they propose a definition, that is, "[p]olicy being a functional design seeking to fulfill certain objectives on the basis of specific calculations of the pros and the cons, and this is naturally context-dependent" (p. 7).  Hence, it has a dynamic character: (1) it considers the changing environment, and (2) it prioritizes public good.

They also enumerate the features of a policy: (1) intentional or deliberately designed to address societal issues; (2) a course of action with specific goals and objectives; (3) devised in response to a perceived need or demand or problem; (4)creates an environment in which various actors converge to develop policy designs; (5) an authoritative decision by the government (Chakbarty and Chand, 2016, p. 8).

Three broad and dynamic disciplines are presented.  It is then instructive to highlight their commonalities or similarities to affirm their interface: (1) systematic (planned, organized, designed, or an approach); (2) change-oriented, preferably for the better if not the best (public good); (3) holistic and multidimensional; (4) pro-people or advocates of equity or social justice, and (5) largely participatory.

Development education, being the youngest field or discipline, has two distinct emphases: sustainable development and global citizenship (Bourn, 2015).  A number of modifiers have come before the term development over time, but the most recent is sustainable, hence, the Sustainable Development Goals (SDGs).  Guru (2016) defines it as "a vision of the future that provides necessary blueprint through which the developmental activities of individuals and institutions can be streamlined on the basis of ethical, humanitarian, and professional considerations" (p. 85).  It has three dimensions: social, economic, and environmental (World Summit on Sustainable Development, 2002 in Guru, 2016).  In fact, it is imperative for both development practitioners and policy makers to understand these dimensions.

Culture 
In the context of globalization, the need for communication is increasing. Many countries has invested in developing their technology which in turns speed up the exchange of information across different countries. This has led to a more complex work context in different institutions especially in business, education, and non-profit organizations. Employees not only has to deal with a lot of things that are not present in a very homogenous environment like observing other religious holidays, communicating in different languages, and also understanding different preferences on certain things. In a multi-cultural environment, organizational culture becomes more complex.

There were countless of research that show how poor communication can lead to poor organizational performance.  It is important for every organisation to develop an effective means to communicate internally and externally in the organization and find ways to develop a health knowledge sharing culture. Understanding the impact of globalisation is crucial for any organisation to be competitive in the global market. In this context, effective communication is expected to create a healthy organizational culture by providing necessary information that will bridge many gaps in the organization.

Flor (2007) noted that "communication and culture are inextricably linked" (p. 112). Seemingly, communication constitutes culture and vice versa in any organizational engagement internally and externally. From time immemorial, effective internal organizational communication which reduces uncertainties and increases productivity in the workplace has been the common goal of many organizations worldwide. Consequently, effective communication processes could mean effective communication policies are in place explicitly or have been legitimized in practice. Making this complicated is perceived in how decision-makers, policy experts and organizational members interact in furthering organizational communication processes. Flor (2007) describes potential complexities at work that could burden more than could help the organization's communication culture.The really difficult part of communication work (and perhaps the most time consuming) is pleasing everybody from your superior, to the subject matter specialist and, finally, to the user whose opinions (and tastes) may altogether vary from those of the decision-maker. This potentially is the most time consuming particularly since, right or wrong, everyone believes that he is a communication expert (p.167-168).

Participatory approach, community radio and policy development 

The roots of participatory approaches in development communication according to Yoon (1996) can be found in the early years of the 1970s when many people in the development community began to question the top-down approach of development dominant in the 1950s and 60s which targeted the economic growth of countries as its main goal. Development according to Yoon (1996) was "thought to be triggered by the wide-scale diffusion and adoption of modern technologies". Such modernization Yoon (1996) further expounds, was planned in the national capitals under the guidance and direction of experts brought-in from developed countries. Often, the people in the villages who are the "objects" of these plans were the last to know when "strangers from the city turned-up, frequently unannounced, to survey land or look at project sites". However, the demarcation of the First, Second and Third Worlds by the late 1960s to early 1980s has broken down and the cross-over centre-periphery can be found in every region, a need for a new concept of development which emphasizes cultural identity and multidimensionality is raised (Servaes and Malikhao, 2005). Servaes and Malikhao (2005) posit that the'global' world, in general as well as in its distinct regional and national entities, is confronted with multifaceted crises. Apart from the obvious economic and financial crisis, they elaborate that one could also refer to social, ideological, moral, political, ethnic, ecological and security crises thus the previously held dependency perspective has become more difficult to support because of the growing interdependency of regions, nations and communities in the globalized world. A new viewpoint on development and social change has come to the forefront according to them which "the common starting point is the examination of the changes from 'bottom-up', from the self-development of the local community".

At first, speech, traditional and folk media, and group activities were considered the most appropriate instruments for supporting participatory communication hence, the practitioners in the mass media responded by innovating their own approach towards participatory communication (Yoon, 1996) which brought the emergence of community radios. The historical philosophy of community radio is to use this medium as the voice of the voiceless, the mouthpiece of the oppressed people and generally as a tool for development. Yoon (1996) articulates that in community radios, the people "produced and voiced the programs which were focused on local issues which were the most current and important making way for participatory communication to be practiced at both the community or village level and at the broader regional or sub-regional level". Most of the successes of community broadcasting are to be found in the non-formal education sector (Beltran,1993 in Yoon, 1996). Literacy programs have been effectively conducted via community radio and television stations. Other subjects covered by these stations include gender issues, farming, health, income-generation, workers' safety and occupational health, land tenure, and religious matters (Yoon, 1996).

Mhagama (2015) posits that participatory development projects such as community radio employ a participatory approach to decision making processes and enable marginalized people to "define their own development path through the identification and implementation of projects that are initiated by them". He stresses that "participatory communication gives the local community a right to freely share or exchange information and to reach a consensus on what they want to do or to be done and how to do it". Tamminga (1997) in Mhagama (2015) addresses that in community radio the dichotomy between the rich and the marginalized sectors like women, indigenous peoples and the poor is broken by "allowing listeners an opportunity to shape the medium to meet their own specific needs and breakdown the monopolies of knowledge and power that marginalize them politically, economically and socially". In one project of UNESCO in partnership with the Danish International Development Agency (DANIDA), and the Philippine government a participatory communication project using community radio dubbed as "Tambuli" (Tambuli is a Filipino term referring to a traditional way of calling villagers to an important meeting)(Jayaweera and Tabing, 1997) was launched in 1991. According to Howley (2005) the project was able to make the community residents come to appreciate radio's potential as a forum to discuss issues of mutual concern allowing the local populations to give immediate and sustained feedback to local, regional and even national political leaders and authorities which afforded them greater opportunity to chart their own destiny.

Howley (2010) as cited in Mhagama (2015) stressed that "community radio highlights people's ability to alter and rearrange existing media structures to better suit their needs". This is made possible Servaes (1996) in Mhagama (2015) concludes because community radio allows non-professionals to participate in media production, management, and planning of the communication systems.

Development communication and the policy sciences work together towards social change 
Flor (n. d., as cited in Academia, 2015) states that policy sciences and development communication have seemingly identical underlying function in society: to solve societal issues and make social change possible for the benefit of the greater majority. Development communication and policy sciences share key characteristics. First, both policy sciences and development communication are purposive. They serve specific and systematic functions to achieve a common goal which is to solve issues and problems in society in order to achieve change. Second, both policy sciences and development communication believe that, at times, power and corrupt practices in the government have the potential to undermine reasoned logic. This is evident in the commercialisation of mass media that advances profit over social responsibility. Thus, development communication and policy sciences have the role to combat such corrupt practices. The third characteristic that policy sciences and development communication share is to heed action for policies to take effect. Policies that remain in print/word without action is a futile enterprise. A policy to be effective needs to be implemented, monitored, assessed and sustained. For development communication and policy sciences to make great impact to the world, participation or engagement of stakeholders is necessary. Below is an analysis of a few studies that deal with how development communication relates with policy sciences, and how they fuse in order to effect change in the larger society. In a discussion on the policy sciences, Allen (1978, as cited in Flor, n. d.) states:Since communication permeates every facet of a person's behaviour, the study of communication is no less than one way to study policy making. Communication is a useful concept precisely because it is one more handle whereby we can effectively study policy making. Communication is one of those few variables through which any policy decision is dependent (p.69).

Another example where development communication takes an important role is in the global health space. International organizations such as the World Health Organization, the Gavi Vaccine Alliance, ASEAN, and the United Nations have all used the principles of development communication to achieve global impacts. Specifically, on 8 August 1967, the Association of Southeast Asian Nations (ASEAN), which was then composed of Indonesia, Malaysia, the Philippines, Singapore, and Thailand was established with the signing of the ASEAN Declaration (Bangkok Declaration). In the succeeding years, other Southeast Asian countries have joined, including Brunei (1984), Viet Nam (1995), Lao PDR (1997), Myanmar (1997), and Cambodia (1999) (ASEAN 2012a: 1). It was established to accelerate the economic growth, social progress, and cultural development in the region; promote regional peace and stability; promote active collaboration and mutual assistance on matters of common interest; provide assistance to each other in the form of training and research facilities; and collaborate more effectively for the greater utilization of their agriculture and industries; among others (ASEAN 2012a: 1). Criticisms on the ASEAN have, however, noted various failures in the regionalism efforts in Southeast Asia. Previous studies have defined regionalism as "more than an institutional process of multilateral policy coordination and the negotiation of competing stakeholder interests... [It is a] collective and intersubjective identities" (Elliott 2003: 29–52). Recent regionalism efforts worldwide also worked either institutionally or through cooperation among governments (Anonymous2005: 2291–2313). Although some argues that the ASEAN's regionalism efforts were seen as more of cooperation among the governments rather than an institutional one, development communication can play a key role in bridging these countries and towards commitment to the Declaration.

Risk and disaster communication amongst the youths 
The youths hold a pivotal role in making a difference in society. Being digital natives, they communicate efficiently, develop networks pervasively, and create, influence and change social norms and practices. In short, being communication natives who can create a collective voice, they have the power to influence policies and change perspectives deeply rooted in society. For instance, during disasters, the youths are viewed as passive victims with no role in communicating risks or preventing and responding to disasters. Since disaster management seems to be predominated by top-down strategies, not bottom-up, the youths are seen as weaklings who are at the receiving end of calamity relief operations. However, Mitchell, Haynes, Hall, Wei and Oven (2008) seem to have refuted this perception based on the findings of their case studies in El Salvador and New Orleans. Mitchell et al. (2008) concluded that children and youths can be potential informants within informal and formal risk communication networks. Their case studies have shown that:children and youth can become effective conduits, vehicles and bridges as they are embedded within the household and community and can act as trusted two-way "translators" and communicators. Overall, children and youth were found to be effective communicators of risk when language barriers exist increasing the agency of young people, an outside agent has helped support the organization of youth groups, the community has strong social cohesion, and there is a level of distrust in political sources (such as police impunity) (p. 269).In the Philippines, a study by Fernandez and Shaw (2013) found that even until today, "young people are not given an active role in (or worse, are excluded from) the action toward disaster risk reduction" (p. 135). Fernandez and Shaw's (2013) review of national policies of the Philippines related to youth council participation in disaster risk reduction (DRR) shows discrepancies between ideal scenarios and actual youth participation in DRR in practice. So much more needs to be done in engaging young people in helping build disaster resilient communities. However, although these discrepancies exist, there are many success stories of Filipino youths involved in development programs with the aim to prepare communities for disasters. The National Youth Commission (NYC, 2013) believed that children and youth are not just a vulnerable group, but can play vital roles in their communities to prepare for future disasters. For instance, the Tanay Mountaineers Youth Arm, a Ten Accomplished Youth Organization (TAYO) 2013 winner, has been responding to victims of disasters not only in Tanay, Rizal but even in Quezon Province since Typhoon Ondoy (Ketsana) hit their town in 2009 (Rappler.com, 2014). The local government of Tanay has tapped the Tanay Mountaineers as the official disaster response team of the municipality. Another TAYO 2013 winner, the Hayag Youth Organization, carried out the "Langoy para sa Kaluwasan," a Swim Camp Disaster Preparedness and Open Water Safety Training for children and youth from impoverished communities in Ormoc City, Leyte. This is in response to the fact that many youths in Ormoc still do not know how to swim apart from the fact that water safety skills are not taught to them in school (Rappler.com, 2014). Despite scepticism, there still exists a growing optimism that policy scientists and communication policy developers can help review and reaffirm existing youth policies in the Philippines in engaging youth groups themselves for DRR projects, among others. Fernandez and Shaw (2013) posited that open and engaging communication is necessary so that the youths become more involved in disaster management and risk reduction efforts in their communities.

Urban farming in cities and countries 
Globalisation has been shaping this world into a small village. With this phenomenon comes urbanisation or massive urban planning that governments and private industries are advancing. With policies being created and governance being mandated, remote heartlands of countries are now slowly being transformed into urbanised places and spaces which in turn produce setbacks such as pollution, health issues and other social problems. However, one trend that is becoming popular in some countries is urban forestry which somehow demands for sound scientific information and public participation. According to Janse and Konijnendijk (2007), urban society's manifold perceptions, preferences and demands for urban forest goods and services indicate the necessity for socially inclusive policy planning processes. They said that successful policies can only be formulated by establishing close links with, for example, urban planning and municipal policies. Inherently, this means that close ties between research and policy are required. They discussed the outcomes of the NeighbourWoods research and development project in which a wide range of tools for public participation were tested in six urban woodland case-studies across Europe. Findings confirmed that a set of tools comprising a step-wise process from informing the public in an attractive way, collecting information on public opinion, towards fully participatory approaches such as direct involvement in decision-making is most likely to ensure socially inclusive planning. Communication with policy-makers requires a high degree of openness, clearly explaining every phase of the process, being open about each other's expectations, and developing relationships based on mutual trust (Janse & Konijnendijk, 2007).

Despite power issues that lurk in most organisations and governments, Development Communication and policy sciences seem to advance specific and systematic functions to achieve a common goal for the benefit of the majority. This is shown in an increasingly global India, whereby an agricultural community in Pune, Maharashtra was faced with losing farmland to urbanisation and devised an unusual solution (Sami, 2013). Pooling their land together, the farmers in this community leveraged their social and political networks to take advantage of the changing economic climate in Pune and built a mixed-use township on their 400 acres of farmland (Sami, 2013). They formed alliances with other stakeholders, both internally within the agricultural community and externally at the city and state levels. Sami (2013) concluded that "ad-hoc coalitions in the power and politics of urban processes in an Indian city have emerged as a result of a political will and leadership vacuum in Indian cities in the face of the changing focus and priorities of national and regional governments as well as a growing gap in urban service provision" (p. 151).

Communication for development (C4D) and e-Agriculture 
If highly urbanised and wealthy cities or countries are advancing urban agriculture, it cannot be denied that many of the Third World countries are also at par when it comes to improving agricultural processes and policies and in the informatisation of agriculture. In Malawi, one of the poorest regions in Africa, Agunga (2012) emphasised that the success rate of poverty-reduction programming could be greater if C4D education was provided for development decision-makers and field staff, especially agricultural extension workers. Agunga (2012) further stated that agricultural extension education can impact development by focusing on how C4D can strengthen agricultural extension performance. He implied that educating policymakers about C4D will increase donor investments in pilot C4D projects, a strengthening of agricultural extension systems, and success of poverty-reduction programs (Agunga, 2012).

In the Philippines, a book by Flor (2007) entitled Development Communication Praxis discussed a rice scandal such that in the last quarter of 1990, the Philippines groaned as the price of rice and other commodities went up. Flor (2007) said: Rice farmers who were expected to gain from the situation were likewise disadvantaged. They were not able to sell their produce at reasonable prices. On one hand, their bumper crop entailed expensive inputs – certified high yielding varieties, irrigation, pesticides and fertilizer. On the other, middle men bought their harvest at cutthroat prices leaving them penniless and in debt... the nature of the rice industry is such that information, particularly market information, means money and power. For all practical purposes, the Philippine rice industry is controlled by a group of obscure Filipino-Chinese businessmen called the Binondo Rice Cartel... Employing a nationwide marketing network composed mainly of fellow Filipino-Chinese traders, the cartel has held a viselike grip over rice trading since the post World War II years that enable them to virtually dictate the buying price of dried paddy all over the country (pp. 114–115).What was done when this happened? Did development communication come into the picture? Was change sought? There were a few discussions on alternatives such as proper use of funds since it was observed that international donations for the agricultural farmers were spent more on the informatisation of agriculture (increasing need for computers, logistical aids, etc.) instead of investing into more practical and realistic methods to empower the farmers and improve their farming methods. Attention was also given to the rise of white-collar jobs which was cutting down the numbers of agricultural farmers tilling the land (Flor, 2007). The youths became more attracted to the life in the city and to seek for office or desk jobs than remain in the province and till the farm. With this, Flor (2007) suggested policy rationalisation: Rationalisation need not mean a reduction of monies awarded to the information sector. It primarily means the rearrangement of priorities and the increase of allotment to actual farming activities in the case of agriculture or to direct social services in the case of rural development. (p. 123).However, with the seemingly hegemonic influence of the internet and the impact of globalisation, the field of agriculture needs to adapt to radical changes in society for it to become sustainable. As policy sciences and development communication suggest, the goal of communication and policies is to empower individuals or groups, and this empowerment necessitates crucial adaptation to an ever-changing world. This brought agriculture into another layer: e-agriculture. What is e-agriculture? The Food and Agriculture Organisation (FAO, 2013) defined this as: <block quote>An emerging field focusing on the enhancement of agricultural and rural development through improved information and communication processes. More specifically, e-Agriculture involves the conceptualization, design, development, evaluation and application of innovative ways to use information and communication technologies (ICT) in the rural domain, with a primary focus on agriculture (p. 1).

In a post on e-Agriculture webpage, Walter (2009), indicates that the Philippines has launched a Knowledge Working Towards Enhancing Agricultural Communities Program or K-Agrinet project with the aim to promoting the use of ICT to attain agricultural sustainability and competitiveness for the country's farmers. The project is a collaborative effort amongst the country's diverse agencies to utilize information technology (IT) as a tool to fast-track the dissemination of agriculture and natural resources information and technologies to farmers, upland dwellers, and rural entrepreneurs in the Philippines. The institutional key players in the agricultural and natural resource sectors are: (1) the e-Learning led by the Open Academy for Philippine Agriculture of the Department of Agriculture-Philippine Rice Research Institute (DA-PhilRice) which focuses on e-extension and distance learning for agriculture extension workers; (2) the e-Consortia led by the Department of Science and Technology-Philippine Council for Agriculture, Forestry and Natural Resources Research and Development (DOST-PCARRD) which intensifies technology and knowledge generation and exchange amongst existing partner R&D Institutions through improved ICT tools and applications; (3) the e-Farm also led by DOST-PCARRD that promotes e-commerce by initiating e- based farm to market opportunities through the FITS centers and their respective farmer-scientists; and lastly, (4) the e-Agrikultura led by the Department of Agrarian Reform (DAR) and Development Academy of the Philippines (DAP) tasked at mobilising and generating the participation of agrarian reform communities into the program (Walter, 2009, p. 1).

Indeed, the goal of C4D and e-agriculture is clear: to improve the lives of people especially the poor and the marginalised. This entails educating and empowering them for the impact of change to be sustainable.

Women's roles on development through advancing policies 
Reports and studies show that women are mostly victims of many kinds of abuse. For instance, Kaunda (1990) described that a smallholder development strategy in Malawi, Africa puts emphasis on commercialization of agriculture, combined with decision making processes which are centralized in the bureaucracy, serving only to reproduce and perpetuate historical forms of social differentiation which are the basis of the women's subordination and/or subjugation.

However, it can be seen in the past few decades that women have been successful in championing a cause and in letting their voices be heard in the society. Women from all walks of life have been engaging themselves into some development projects. For Instance, in the Philippines, the World Food Programme (WFP, 2012) launched a project in the Philippine island of Mindanao to helping women kick start agriculture in the region by providing them with the training they need to become successful farmers. This shows that women can be empowered and independent – two qualities that development communication and policy sciences are championing. HumanaPeopletoPeople (2012) is also promoting gender equality in India, whereby, to release the empowerment of women, the women in their communities have formed coalitions such as women self-help groups focusing on community projects. The women are empowered to bargain, to have economic influence, to earn money for improvement of health and education of the family and to gain a stronger social standing.

Either in the First World or in the Third World nations, a huge number of women are making a difference in a lot of fields with the goal to contribute to character and nation-building. In the field of developing women's capacities to run and manage their small-medium enterprises (SMEs), Gail Romero, the founder and CEO for Collective Changes, has been providing effective technology platforms to business mentors for women's SMEs in developing nations. Gail continues to drive support for empowering women in business and global recognition of the economic engine that women can provide to their nations. Gail is also Senior Advisor for MacKenzie-Romero Consulting, Executive Producer for Rainmakers TV and carried the title of Ambassador for Global Health for the American Cancer Society until August 2011. Gail has spent the last two decades creating and directing the development and integration of innovative economic ideas and campaigns and strategic alliances with policy makers to advance women in leadership throughout the world... She has held numerous corporate board positions for start-up companies and guided new social venture partnerships. She has served as a visiting professor and international speaker and presenter on social justice, women's issues and education. Gail is a recent TED Prize nominee for her work to leverage technology to grow women's business skills ("Advancing Women in Leadership", 2014).Development communication and policy sciences have gone a long way to advancing the rights and freedom of people – children and youths, women, farmers, labourers, etc., with the goal that they become more informed and empowered to make decisions for themselves and their communities, to realise their full potential and to become a catalyst for change as Flor (2007) postulated.

Agenda setting 
Agenda setting is an important topic in the Development Communication and policy sciences because it sets problems and issues into policies. It sets the tone of how policies are crafted, based on the needs of the public.  Equally important in this discussion is understanding the Agenda Setting Process by which problems and alternative solutions gain or lose public and elite attention (Birkland, 2011).  It is in this area where individuals take collective action and vie for attention.  According to Schattschneider (1960), groups that successfully describe a problem will also be the one to define the solutions to it, thereby prevailing in public debate.

Another idea offered by Schattschneider is the Theory of Group Mobilization & Participation in Agenda Setting wherein the issues are more likely to be elevated to agenda status if the scope of conflict is broadened.  There are 2 ways to broaden an issue:
 Groups go public by using symbols and images or;
 Groups to lose the first level of public interest appeal to a higher decision-making level.
When powerful groups lose control of the agenda, they are said to enter into policy debates to gain attention (Baumgartner & Jones), while other groups do venue shopping and ally with those who are able to advance their issues.

Levels of Agenda

From the vast field of issues (Agenda Universe), groups push issues meriting public attention "within the legitimate jurisdiction of existing governmental authority" (Birkland, quoting Cobb and Elder), moving to the next level (Systemic Agenda).  Ideas that gain active and serious consideration of decision/policy makers go the next level (Institutional Agenda).  If acted upon, it reaches Decision Agenda—the last level in the policy making process.  Within these levels there are push and pull actions that happen between and among interest groups in order to pursue or challenge such initiatives.

Process of Policy Development (also Stages of the Policy Cycle)

It includes the following activities that sets off creation of policies:
 Issue Framing – which is a technique of getting the issues on the policy maker's agenda so that a problem is recognized and debated.
 Agenda setting as already discussed in previous paragraphs.
 Policy Formulation wherein proposed actions are articulated, debated and drafter into language.
 Advocacy & policy dialogue which will involve and mobilize stakeholders and the public, and
 Data analysis which focuses on political costs and benefits.

See also 
Global South Development Magazine
Global digital divide
New World Information and Communication Order
World Summit on the Information Society

References

Further reading 

Food and Agriculture Organisation. (2013). What is e-agriculture? Retrieved from 
HumanaPeopletoPeople. (29 January 2012). Women self-help groups in community development projects (CDP) Orissa HPP India. [YouTube video]. Retrieved from Women Self-Help Groups in Community Development Project (CDP) Orissa HPP India

Mitchell, T., Haynes, K., Hall, N., Wei, C., & Oven, K. (2008). The roles of children and youth in communicating disaster risk. Children Youth and Environments, 18(1), 254–279.
Rappler.com (14 July 2014). Young Pinoys urged to prepare for disasters. Rappler. Retrieved from Young Pinoys urged to prepare for disasters

TEDx Talks. (24 April 2014). Advancing women in leadership: Gail Romero at TEDxTacoma. [YouTube video]. Retrieved from Advancing women in leadership: Gail Romero at TEDxTacoma
Walter, A. M. (2009). Philippines government launches K-agrinet project to benefit farmers. e-Agriculture. Retrieved from 
World Food Programme. (3 April 2012). Philippines: Women join together to rebuild lives after conflict. [YouTube video]. Retrieved from Philippines: Women Join Together To Rebuild Lives After Conflict

Quebral, NC 2006, 'Development communication in the agricultural context (1971, with a new foreword)', Asian Journal of Communication, vol. 16, no. 1, pp. 100–107.  
Sloman, Annie. (2011). Using Participatory Theatre in International Community Development, Community Development Journal.

Hedebro, Goran. (1982). Communication and social change in developing nations: A critical view. Ames, IA: Iowa State University Press.
McPhail, Thomas. (2009). Development communication: Reframing the role of the media. London, UK: Wiley-Blackwell.

Rogers, Everett M. (1989). "Inquiry in development communication". In Molefi Kete Asante & William B. Gudykunst (Eds.), Handbook of international and intercultural communication (pp. 67–85). Newbury Park, CA: Sage.

External links 
Association for Progressive Communications
College of Development Communication, University of the Philippines Los Banos
Communication Initiative Network
Communication for Social Change Consortium
Communication for Sustainable Development Initiative
Development Communication Online Forums
"Major Trends in Development Communication", International Development Research Centre, Canada
World Bank Development Communication

Communication studies
International development